The following is a list of players, both past and current, who appeared at least in one game for the Detroit Pistons NBA franchise.


Players
Note: Statistics are correct through the end of the  season.

A to B

|-
|align="left"| || align="center"|G || align="left"|Pepperdine || align="center"|2 || align="center"| || 12 || 55 || 7 || 5 || 18 || 4.6 || 0.6 || 0.4 || 1.5 || align=center|
|-
|align="left"| || align="center"|F || align="left"|Northwestern || align="center"|3 || align="center"|– || 195 || 5,472 || 1,111 || 328 || 1,710 || 28.1 || 5.7 || 1.7 || 8.8 || align=center|
|-
|align="left"| || align="center"|G/F || align="left"|Syracuse || align="center"|1 || align="center"| || 79 || 1,776 || 242 || 109 || 656 || 22.5 || 3.1 || 1.4 || 8.3 || align=center|
|-
|align="left"| || align="center"|G/F || align="left"|UCLA || align="center"|2 || align="center"|– || 149 || 2,204 || 271 || 96 || 639 || 14.8 || 1.8 || 0.6 || 4.3 || align=center|
|-
|align="left"| || align="center"|G/F || align="left"|DePaul || align="center"|5 || align="center"|– || 318 || 7,717 || 1,218 || 604 || 4,115 || 24.3 || 3.8 || 1.9 || 12.9 || align=center|
|-
|align="left"| || align="center"|C || align="left"|Fresno State || align="center"|1 || align="center"| || 58 || 670 || 279 || 22 || 230 || 11.6 || 4.8 || 0.4 || 4.0 || align=center|
|-
|align="left"| || align="center"|F/C || align="left"|Iowa State || align="center"|1 || align="center"| || 15 || 97 || 29 || 6 || 40 || 6.5 || 1.9 || 0.4 || 2.7 || align=center|
|-
|align="left"| || align="center"|F/C || align="left"|Houston || align="center"|1 || align="center"| || 77 || 1,624 || 571 || 51 || 491 || 21.1 || 7.4 || 0.7 || 6.4 || align=center|
|-
|align="left"| || align="center"|C || align="left"|UNLV || align="center"|2 || align="center"|– || 68 || 502 || 114 || 6 || 105 || 7.4 || 1.7 || 0.1 || 1.5 || align=center|
|-
|align="left"| || align="center"|G/F || align="left"|Indiana || align="center"|3 || align="center"|– || 153 ||  || 89 || 358 || 1,040 ||  || 2.3 || 2.3 || 6.8 || align=center|
|-
|align="left"| || align="center"|F || align="left"|Penn State || align="center"|1 || align="center"| || 31 || 409 || 170 || 18 || 147 || 13.2 || 5.5 || 0.6 || 4.7 || align=center|
|-
|align="left"| || align="center"|G || align="left"|FIU || align="center"|2 || align="center"|– || 90 || 1,306 || 128 || 283 || 373 || 14.5 || 1.4 || 3.1 || 4.1 || align=center|
|-
|align="left"| || align="center"|G || align="left"|Indiana State || align="center"|1 || align="center"| || 18 || 160 || 24 || 19 || 44 || 8.9 || 1.3 || 1.1 || 2.4 || align=center|
|-
|align="left"| || align="center"|G || align="left"|South Florida || align="center"|5 || align="center"|– || 305 || 7,441 || 504 || 954 || 2,800 || 24.4 || 1.7 || 3.1 || 9.2 || align=center|
|-
|align="left"| || align="center"|G/F || align="left"|UNLV || align="center"|1 || align="center"| || 20 || 292 || 49 || 15 || 90 || 14.6 || 2.5 || 0.8 || 4.5 || align=center|
|-
|align="left"| || align="center"|G || align="left"|Texas || align="center"|1 || align="center"| || 54 || 1,287 || 100 || 265 || 574 || 23.8 || 1.9 || 4.9 || 10.6 || align=center|
|-
|align="left"| || align="center"|F || align="left"|Rice || align="center"|1 || align="center"| || 7 || 28 || 3 || 1 || 12 || 4.0 || 0.4 || 0.1 || 1.7 || align=center|
|-
|align="left"| || align="center"|G || align="left"|Illinois || align="center"|1 || align="center"| || 9 || 123 || 22 || 15 || 22 || 13.7 || 2.4 || 1.7 || 2.4 || align=center|
|-
|align="left"| || align="center"|F/C || align="left"|Providence || align="center"|2 || align="center"|– || 65 || 1,258 || 344 || 64 || 630 || 19.4 || 5.3 || 1.0 || 9.7 || align=center|
|-
|align="left"| || align="center"|G || align="left"|Tennessee State || align="center"|1 || align="center"| || 45 || 926 || 112 || 113 || 337 || 20.6 || 2.5 || 2.5 || 7.5 || align=center|
|-
|align="left"| || align="center"|G/F || align="left"|Notre Dame || align="center"|1 || align="center"| || 17 || 185 ||  || 12 || 29 || 10.9 ||  || 0.7 || 1.7 || align=center|
|-
|align="left"| || align="center"|G || align="left"|Boston College || align="center"|2 || align="center"|– || 89 || 1,661 || 151 || 188 || 671 || 18.7 || 1.7 || 2.1 || 7.5 || align=center|
|-
|align="left"| || align="center"|G || align="left"|Georgia Tech || align="center"|2 || align="center"|– || 162 || 3,458 || 414 || 480 || 1,294 || 21.3 || 2.6 || 3.0 || 8.0 || align=center|
|-
|align="left"| || align="center"|C || align="left"|Washington State || align="center"|2 || align="center"|– || 156 || 2,396 || 717 || 83 || 879 || 15.4 || 4.6 || 0.5 || 5.6 || align=center|
|-
|align="left"| || align="center"|G || align="left"|Arkansas || align="center"|1 || align="center"| || 8 || 30 || 5 || 0 || 10 || 3.8 || 0.6 || 0.0 || 1.3 || align=center|
|-
|align="left"| || align="center"|C || align="left"|Memphis || align="center"|4 || align="center"|– || 172 || 1,469 || 317 || 52 || 605 || 8.5 || 1.8 || 0.3 || 3.5 || align=center|
|-
|align="left"| || align="center"|F/C || align="left"|Minnesota || align="center"|1 || align="center"| || 1 || 1 || 0 || 0 || 0 || 1.0 || 0.0 || 0.0 || 0.0 || align=center|
|-
|align="left" bgcolor="#FFFF99"|^ || align="center"|C || align="left"|Indiana || align="center"|2 || align="center"|– || 109 || 3,196 || 1,113 || 154 || 1,554 || 29.3 || 10.2 || 1.4 || 14.3 || align=center|
|-
|align="left"| || align="center"|C || align="left"|Indiana || align="center"|7 || align="center"|– || 398 || 10,003 || 2,437 || 734 || 3,804 || 25.1 || 6.1 || 1.8 || 9.6 || align=center|
|-
|align="left"| || align="center"|C || align="left"|Valparaiso || align="center"|1 || align="center"| || 7 || 38 || 9 || 1 || 14 || 5.4 || 1.3 || 0.1 || 2.0 || align=center|
|-
|align="left" bgcolor="#FFCC00"|+ (#1) || align="center"|G || align="left"|Colorado || align="center"|8 || align="center"|– || 482 || 16,310 || 1,559 || 2,984 || 7,940 || 33.8 || 3.2 || 6.2 || 16.5 || align=center|
|-
|align="left" bgcolor="#FFFF99"|^ (#21) || align="center"|G || align="left"|Syracuse || align="center"|9 || align="center"|– || 675 || 26,052 || 2,828 || 4,330 || 15,235 || 38.6 || 4.2 || 6.4 || 22.6 || align=center|
|-
|align="left"| || align="center"|F/C || align="left"|Kansas || align="center"|2 || align="center"|– || 53 ||  ||  || 100 || 512 ||  ||  || 1.9 || 9.7 || align=center|
|-
|align="left"| || align="center"|G || align="left"|Saint Joseph's || align="center"|1 || align="center"| || 3 || 28 || 2 || 2 || 8 || 9.3 || 0.7 || 0.7 || 2.7 || align=center|
|-
|align="left"| || align="center"|G || align="left"|Maryland || align="center"|1 || align="center"| || 58 || 986 || 89 || 200 || 254 || 17.0 || 1.5 || 3.4 || 4.4 || align=center|
|-
|align="left"| || align="center"|G || align="left"|Iowa State || align="center"|1 || align="center"| || 14 || 166 || 15 || 17 || 25 || 11.9 || 1.1 || 1.2 || 1.8 || align=center|
|-
|align="left"| || align="center"|G || align="left"|Texas || align="center"|2 || align="center"|– || 81 || 403 || 42 || 45 || 128 || 5.0 || 0.5 || 0.6 || 1.6 || align=center|
|-
|align="left"| || align="center"|G || align="left"|Minnesota || align="center"|1 || align="center"| || 3 || 21 || 0 || 0 || 4 || 7.0 || 0.0 || 0.0 || 1.3 || align=center|
|-
|align="left"| || align="center"|G || align="left"|Minnesota || align="center"|1 || align="center"| || 5 || 51 || 5 || 7 || 10 || 10.2 || 1.0 || 1.4 || 2.0 || align=center|
|-
|align="left"| || align="center"|F || align="left"|New Mexico State || align="center"|1 || align="center"| || 4 || 48 || 16 || 3 || 26 || 12.0 || 4.0 || 0.8 || 6.5 || align=center|
|-
|align="left"| || align="center"|G/F || align="left"|Western Michigan || align="center"|1 || align="center"| || 17 || 377 || 58 || 21 || 104 || 22.2 || 3.4 || 1.2 || 6.1 || align=center|
|-
|align="left"| || align="center"|G || align="left"|Detroit Mercy || align="center"|1 || align="center"| || 5 || 40 || 2 || 7 || 6 || 8.0 || 0.4 || 1.4 || 1.2 || align=center|
|-
|align="left"| || align="center"|G || align="left"|Texas || align="center"|1 || align="center"| || 40 || 1,268 || 94 || 83 || 601 || 31.7 || 2.4 || 2.1 || 15.0 || align=center|
|-
|align="left"| || align="center"|F/C || align="left"|Minnesota || align="center"|1 || align="center"| || 25 || 310 || 105 || 13 || 57 || 12.4 || 4.2 || 0.5 || 2.3 || align=center|
|-
|align="left"| || align="center"|C || align="left"|Slovenia || align="center"|1 || align="center"| || 17 || 98 || 19 || 4 || 27 || 5.8 || 1.1 || 0.2 || 1.6 || align=center|
|-
|align="left" bgcolor="#FFCC00"|+ || align="center"|G || align="left"|LSU || align="center"|5 || align="center"|– || 306 || 7,616 || 659 || 683 || 3,097 || 24.9 || 2.2 || 2.2 || 10.1 || align=center|
|-
|align="left"| || align="center"|G || align="left"|Michigan || align="center"|1 || align="center"| || 7 || 16 || 4 || 2 || 9 || 2.3 || 0.6 || 0.3 || 1.3 || align=center|
|-
|align="left" bgcolor="#CCFFCC"|x || align="center"|G || align="left"|Miami (FL) || align="center"|1 || align="center"| || 74 || 1,449 || 185 || 91 || 319 || 19.6 || 2.5 || 1.2 || 4.3 || align=center|
|-
|align="left"| || align="center"|F || align="left"|Glynn Academy (GA) || align="center"|2 || align="center"|– || 106 || 1,659 || 467 || 54 || 400 || 15.7 || 4.4 || 0.5 || 3.8 || align=center|
|-
|align="left"| || align="center"|G || align="left"|Murray State || align="center"|1 || align="center"| || 6 || 45 || 7 || 3 || 10 || 7.5 || 1.2 || 0.5 || 1.7 || align=center|
|-
|align="left"| || align="center"|C || align="left"|Kansas || align="center"|2 || align="center"|– || 72 || 776 || 220 || 24 || 132 || 10.8 || 3.1 || 0.3 || 1.8 || align=center|
|-
|align="left"| || align="center"|G/F || align="left"|Arizona || align="center"|3 || align="center"|– || 165 || 2,450 || 318 || 129 || 597 || 14.8 || 1.9 || 0.8 || 3.6 || align=center|
|-
|align="left"| || align="center"|G/F || align="left"|North Carolina || align="center"|4 || align="center"|– || 174 || 3,983 || 409 || 260 || 1,495 || 22.9 || 2.4 || 1.5 || 8.6 || align=center|
|-
|align="left"| || align="center"|F/C || align="left"|Michigan || align="center"|1 || align="center"| || 42 || 713 || 252 || 36 || 324 || 17.0 || 6.0 || 0.9 || 7.7 || align=center|
|-
|align="left"| || align="center"|F || align="left"|Tennessee || align="center"|2 || align="center"|– || 62 || 245 || 155 || 38 || 120 || 8.4 || 2.5 || 0.6 || 1.9 || align=center|
|-
|align="left"| || align="center"|G || align="left"|Pikeville || align="center"|3 || align="center"|– || 138 || 2,995 || 495 || 330 || 967 || 21.7 || 3.6 || 2.4 || 7.0 || align=center|
|-
|align="left"| || align="center"|F || align="left"|UConn || align="center"|1 || align="center"| || 78 || 1,623 || 196 || 79 || 460 || 20.8 || 2.5 || 1.0 || 5.9 || align=center|
|-
|align="left"| || align="center"|G || align="left"|Marquette || align="center"|1 || align="center"| || 29 || 427 || 41 || 59 || 215 || 14.7 || 1.4 || 2.0 || 7.4 || align=center|
|-
|align="left"| || align="center"|G || align="left"|Georgia Tech || align="center"|6 || align="center"|– || 338 || 6,382 || 543 || 1,148 || 2,845 || 18.9 || 1.6 || 3.4 || 8.4 || align=center|
|}

C

|-
|align="left"| || align="center"|F || align="left"|Bradley || align="center"|2 || align="center"|– || 38 || 387 || 136 || 18 || 157 || 10.2 || 3.6 || 0.5 || 4.1 || align=center|
|-
|align="left"| || align="center"|G || align="left"|Spain || align="center"|2 || align="center"| || 77 || 1,519 || 130 || 300 || 439 || 19.7 || 1.7 || 3.9 || 5.7 || align=center|
|-
|align="left"| || align="center"|G/F || align="left"|Arizona State || align="center"|2 || align="center"|– || 99 || 2,259 || 631 || 183 || 1,055 || 22.8 || 6.4 || 1.8 || 10.7 || align=center|
|-
|align="left"| || align="center"|G || align="left"|Georgia || align="center"|4 || align="center"|– || 314 || 9,488 || 941 || 495 || 3,665 || 30.2 || 3.0 || 1.6 || 11.7 || align=center|
|-
|align="left"| || align="center"|C || align="left"|Clemson || align="center"|2 || align="center"|– || 95 || 1,232 || 291 || 61 || 479 || 13.0 || 3.1 || 0.6 || 5.0 || align=center|
|-
|align="left"| || align="center"|G/F || align="left"|Ohio State || align="center"|3 || align="center"|– || 178 || 2,249 || 383 || 88 || 1,102 || 12.6 || 2.2 || 0.5 || 6.2 || align=center|
|-
|align="left"| || align="center"|F || align="left"|Purdue || align="center"|2 || align="center"|– || 23 || 169 || 29 || 5 || 48 || 7.3 || 1.3 || 0.2 || 2.1 || align=center|
|-
|align="left"| || align="center"|F/C || align="left"|East Texas State || align="center"|2 || align="center"|– || 87 ||  || 62 || 108 || 715 ||  || 3.0 || 1.2 || 8.2 || align=center|
|-
|align="left"| || align="center"|F || align="left"|NC State || align="center"|1 || align="center"| || 28 || 444 || 137 || 23 || 207 || 15.9 || 4.9 || 0.8 || 7.4 || align=center|
|-
|align="left"| || align="center"|G/F || align="left"|Guilford || align="center"|3 || align="center"|– || 241 || 8,406 || 1,777 || 628 || 3,568 || 34.9 || 7.4 || 2.6 || 14.8 || align=center|
|-
|align="left"| || align="center"|G/F || align="left"|St. Bonaventure || align="center"|1 || align="center"| || 1 || 5 || 0 || 1 || 3 || 5.0 || 0.0 || 1.0 || 3.0 || align=center|
|-
|align="left"| || align="center"|F || align="left"|Bowling Green || align="center"|1 || align="center"| || 6 || 49 || 16 || 1 || 21 || 8.2 || 2.7 || 0.2 || 3.5 || align=center|
|-
|align="left"| || align="center"|C || align="left"|Iowa State || align="center"|1 || align="center"| || 4 || 34 || 7 || 2 || 10 || 8.5 || 1.8 || 0.5 || 2.5 || align=center|
|-
|align="left"| || align="center"|F || align="left"|Cal State Fullerton || align="center"|1 || align="center"| || 13 || 166 || 26 || 7 || 75 || 12.8 || 2.0 || 0.5 || 5.8 || align=center|
|-
|align="left"| || align="center"|F/C || align="left"|Wake Forest || align="center"|1 || align="center"| || 57 || 999 || 346 || 48 || 570 || 17.5 || 6.1 || 0.8 || 10.0 || align=center|
|-
|align="left"| || align="center"|F/C || align="left"|North Carolina || align="center"|1 || align="center"| || 30 || 391 || 100 || 15 || 115 || 13.0 || 3.3 || 0.5 || 3.8 || align=center|
|-
|align="left"| || align="center"|G || align="left"|Wake Forest || align="center"|1 || align="center"| || 4 || 30 || 1 || 2 || 10 || 7.5 || 0.3 || 0.5 || 2.5 || align=center|
|-
|align="left"| || align="center"|G || align="left"|Minnesota || align="center"|1 || align="center"| || 79 || 1,589 || 137 || 218 || 600 || 20.1 || 1.7 || 2.8 || 7.6 || align=center|
|-
|align="left"| || align="center"|G || align="left"|Michigan State || align="center"|1 || align="center"| || 78 || 1,268 || 132 || 207 || 422 || 16.3 || 1.7 || 2.7 || 5.4 || align=center|
|-
|align="left" bgcolor="#FFFF99"|^ || align="center"|F/C || align="left"|Xavier (LS) || align="center"|1 || align="center"| || 68 || 1,435 || 403 || 76 || 525 || 21.1 || 5.9 || 1.1 || 7.7 || align=center|
|-
|align="left"| || align="center"|F/C || align="left"|Rice || align="center"|1 || align="center"| || 57 || 1,120 || 204 || 76 || 347 || 19.6 || 3.6 || 1.3 || 6.1 || align=center|
|-
|align="left"| || align="center"|F || align="left"|Maryland || align="center"|1 || align="center"| || 9 || 77 || 26 || 0 || 28 || 8.6 || 2.9 || 0.0 || 3.1 || align=center|
|-
|align="left"| || align="center"|F || align="left"|Syracuse || align="center"|1 || align="center"| || 5 || 50 || 15 || 0 || 9 || 10.0 || 3.0 || 0.0 || 1.8 || align=center|
|-
|align="left"| || align="center"|G/F || align="left"|Fordham || align="center"|2 || align="center"|– || 85 || 1,990 || 437 || 143 || 958 || 23.4 || 5.1 || 1.7 || 11.3 || align=center|
|-
|align="left" bgcolor="#FFFF99"|^ || align="center"|F || align="left"|Duquesne || align="center"|1 || align="center"| || 32 || 570 || 101 || 28 || 124 || 17.8 || 3.2 || 0.9 || 3.9 || align=center|
|-
|align="left"| || align="center"|G || align="left"|Georgetown || align="center"|1 || align="center"| || 8 || 65 || 5 || 5 || 11 || 8.1 || 0.6 || 0.6 || 1.4 || align=center|
|-
|align="left"| || align="center"|C || align="left"|Boston College || align="center"|1 || align="center"| || 2 || 3 || 1 || 0 || 0 || 1.5 || 0.5 || 0.0 || 0.0 || align=center|
|-
|align="left"| || align="center"|G/F || align="left"|Western Michigan || align="center"|1 || align="center"| || 2 ||  ||  || 0 || 6 ||  ||  || 0.0 || 3.0 || align=center|
|-
|align="left"| || align="center"|G || align="left"|Virginia || align="center"|1 || align="center"| || 69 || 937 || 75 || 128 || 325 || 13.6 || 1.1 || 1.9 || 4.7 || align=center|
|-
|align="left"| || align="center"|F/C || align="left"|Detroit Mercy || align="center"|3 || align="center"|– || 234 || 4,566 || 1,210 || 256 || 1,376 || 19.5 || 5.2 || 1.1 || 5.9 || align=center|
|-
|align="left"| || align="center"|F || align="left"|Boston College || align="center"|1 || align="center"| || 53 || 595 || 124 || 25 || 143 || 11.2 || 2.3 || 0.5 || 2.7 || align=center|
|-
|align="left"| || align="center"|G/F || align="left"|Georgia Southern || align="center"|6 || align="center"|–– || 432 || 8,529 || 719 || 519 || 1,946 || 19.7 || 1.7 || 1.2 || 4.5 || align=center|
|}

D

|-
|align="left" bgcolor="#FFFF99"|^ || align="center"|G/F || align="left"|Notre Dame || align="center"|3 || align="center"|– || 192 || 6,221 || 723 || 426 || 3,894 || 32.4 || 3.8 || 2.2 || 20.3 || align=center|
|-
|align="left"| || align="center"|F || align="left"|Italy || align="center"|2 || align="center"|– || 37 || 255 || 50 || 13 || 94 || 6.9 || 1.4 || 0.4 || 2.5 || align=center|
|-
|align="left"| || align="center"|F || align="left"|Hungary || align="center"|1 || align="center"| || 10 || 69 || 19 || 3 || 20 || 6.9 || 1.9 || 0.3 || 2.0 || align=center|
|-
|align="left"| || align="center"|F/C || align="left"|Clemson || align="center"|2 || align="center"|– || 74 || 642 || 190 || 18 || 109 || 8.7 || 2.6 || 0.2 || 1.5 || align=center|
|-
|align="left"| || align="center"|G || align="left"|North Carolina || align="center"|2 || align="center"|– || 46 || 351 || 36 || 30 || 79 || 7.6 || 0.8 || 0.7 || 1.7 || align=center|
|-
|align="left"| || align="center"|F/C || align="left"|Colorado || align="center"|4 || align="center"|– || 282 || 3,480 || 1,035 || 270 || 1,285 || 12.3 || 3.7 || 1.0 || 4.6 || align=center|
|-
|align="left"| || align="center"|C || align="left"|Maynard Evans HS (FL) || align="center"|2 || align="center"|– || 16 || 55 || 7 || 2 || 31 || 3.4 || 0.4 || 0.1 || 1.9 || align=center|
|-
|align="left"| || align="center"|G || align="left"|Duke || align="center"|1 || align="center"| || 50 || 1,170 || 113 || 205 || 325 || 23.4 || 2.3 || 4.1 || 6.5 || align=center|
|-
|align="left"| || align="center"|F || align="left"|Gonzaga || align="center"|4 || align="center"|– || 206 || 3,312 || 602 || 166 || 1,202 || 16.1 || 2.9 || 0.8 || 5.8 || align=center|
|-
|align="left" bgcolor="#FFFF99"|^ || align="center"|G/F || align="left"|Detroit Mercy || align="center"|7 || align="center"|– || 440 || 15,235 || 4,947 || 1,152 || 7,096 || 34.6 || 11.2 || 2.6 || 16.1 || align=center|
|-
|align="left"| || align="center"|F/C || align="left"|Indiana || align="center"|2 || align="center"|– || 101 || 1,552 || 491 || 60 || 852 || 15.4 || 4.9 || 0.6 || 8.4 || align=center|
|-
|align="left"| || align="center"|F/C || align="left"|Arizona || align="center"|2 || align="center"|– || 127 || 3,796 || 967 || 165 || 1,774 || 29.9 || 7.6 || 1.3 || 14.0 || align=center|
|-
|align="left"| || align="center"|G || align="left"|Argentina || align="center"|3 || align="center"|– || 180 || 2,557 || 434 || 170 || 791 || 14.2 || 2.4 || 0.9 || 4.4 || align=center|
|-
|align="left"| || align="center"|G || align="left"|Kentucky || align="center"|1 || align="center"| || 23 || 378 || 51 || 33 || 180 || 16.4 || 2.2 || 1.4 || 7.8 || align=center|
|-
|align="left"| || align="center"|F || align="left"|Wyoming || align="center"|1 || align="center"| || 31 || 74 || 23 || 5 || 36 || 2.4 || 0.7 || 0.2 || 1.2 || align=center|
|-
|align="left"| || align="center"|G || align="left"|George Washington || align="center"|2 || align="center"|– || 140 || 2,777 || 317 || 279 || 1,023 || 19.8 || 2.3 || 2.0 || 7.3 || align=center|
|-
|align="left"| || align="center"|G || align="left"|Charleston || align="center"|1 || align="center"| || 17 || 112 || 3 || 8 || 28 || 6.6 || 0.2 || 0.5 || 1.6 || align=center|
|-
|align="left"| || align="center"|G || align="left"|Colorado || align="center"|2 || align="center"|– || 46 || 614 || 65 || 126 || 203 || 13.3 || 1.4 || 2.7 || 4.4 || align=center|
|-
|align="left" bgcolor="#FFCC00"|+ || align="center"|G/F || align="left"|Purdue || align="center"|6 || align="center"|– || 452 || 11,761 || 2,331 || 716 || 5,512 || 26.0 || 5.2 || 1.6 || 12.2 || align=center|
|-
|align="left"| || align="center"|G || align="left"|Maryland || align="center"|1 || align="center"| || 17 || 244 || 28 || 32 || 110 || 14.4 || 1.6 || 1.9 || 6.5 || align=center|
|-
|align="left"| || align="center"|F/C || align="left"|Alabama || align="center"|4 || align="center"|– || 309 || 7,616 || 2,273 || 375 || 2,939 || 24.6 || 7.4 || 1.2 || 9.5 || align=center|
|-
|align="left"| || align="center"|F || align="left"|St. John's || align="center"|2 || align="center"|– || 57 || 398 || 114 || 23 || 174 || 7.0 || 2.0 || 0.4 || 3.1 || align=center|
|-
|align="left"| || align="center"|F || align="left"|Belmont Abbey || align="center"|1 || align="center"| || 4 || 25 || 8 || 3 || 16 || 6.3 || 2.0 || 0.8 || 4.0 || align=center|
|-
|align="left"| || align="center"|G || align="left"|Missouri || align="center"|1 || align="center"| || 76 || 1,581 || 120 || 249 || 504 || 20.8 || 1.6 || 3.3 || 6.6 || align=center|
|-
|align="left"| || align="center"|F || align="left"|Boston College || align="center"|1 || align="center"| || 69 || 1,255 || 402 || 54 || 372 || 18.2 || 5.8 || 0.8 || 5.4 || align=center|
|-
|align="left" bgcolor="#FBCEB1"|* || align="center"|C || align="left"|UConn || align="center"|7 || align="center"|– || 542 || 16,711 || 7,424 || 626 || 7,661 || 30.8 || bgcolor="#CFECEC"|13.7 || 1.2 || 14.1 || align=center|
|-
|align="left"| || align="center"|G || align="left"|Detroit Mercy || align="center"|1 || align="center"| || 67 || 1,331 || 98 || 117 || 624 || 19.9 || 1.5 || 1.7 || 9.3 || align=center|
|-
|align="left"| || align="center"|G || align="left"|Colgate || align="center"|2 || align="center"|– || 46 || 632 || 58 || 79 || 228 || 13.7 || 1.3 || 1.7 || 5.0 || align=center|
|-
|align="left" bgcolor="#FFCC00"|+ || align="center"|C || align="left"|Seton Hall || align="center"|6 || align="center"|– || 422 || 11,515 || 4,986 || 515 || 4,580 || 27.3 || 11.8 || 1.2 || 10.9 || align=center|
|-
|align="left" bgcolor="#FFFF99"|^ (#4) || align="center"|G || align="left"|McNeese State || align="center" bgcolor="#CFECEC"|14 || align="center"|– || bgcolor="#CFECEC"|1,018 || 35,139 || 2,203 || 4,612 || 16,401 || 34.5 || 2.2 || 4.5 || 16.1 || align=center|
|-
|align="left"| || align="center"|F || align="left"|LSU || align="center"|3 || align="center"|– || 67 || 569 || 112 || 29 || 177 || 8.5 || 1.7 || 0.4 || 2.6 || align=center|
|}

E to F

|-
|align="left"| || align="center"|G || align="left"|Detroit Mercy || align="center"|1 || align="center"| || 8 || 50 || 8 || 4 || 15 || 6.3 || 1.0 || 0.5 || 1.9 || align=center|
|-
|align="left"| || align="center"|F || align="left"|Missouri || align="center"|4 || align="center"|– || 220 || 4,138 || 760 || 175 || 1,490 || 18.8 || 3.5 || 0.8 || 6.8 || align=center|
|-
|align="left"| || align="center"|G/F || align="left"|Illinois || align="center"|2 || align="center"|– || 85 || 1,859 || 273 || 127 || 719 || 21.9 || 3.2 || 1.5 || 8.5 || align=center|
|-
|align="left"| || align="center"|F/C || align="left"|Washington || align="center"|4 || align="center"|– || 256 || 5,768 || 930 || 182 || 2,867 || 22.5 || 3.6 || 0.7 || 11.2 || align=center|
|-
|align="left"| || align="center"|G || align="left"|Providence || align="center"|3 || align="center"|– || 128 || 2,286 || 207 || 332 || 860 || 17.9 || 1.6 || 2.6 || 6.7 || align=center|
|-
|align="left"| || align="center"|F || align="left"|Marquette || align="center"|3 || align="center"|– || 59 || 500 || 131 || 28 || 223 || 8.5 || 2.2 || 0.5 || 3.8 || align=center|
|-
|align="left"| || align="center"|G || align="left"|North Carolina || align="center"|1 || align="center"| || 28 || 764 || 60 || 43 || 336 || 27.3 || 2.1 || 1.5 || 12.0 || align=center|
|-
|align="left"| || align="center"|F || align="left"|Arizona || align="center"|1 || align="center"| || 73 || 2,409 || 263 || 197 || 885 || 33.0 || 3.6 || 2.7 || 12.1 || align=center|
|-
|align="left"| || align="center"|G || align="left"|Missouri || align="center"|1 || align="center"| || 41 || 407 || 37 || 26 || 119 || 9.9 || 0.9 || 0.6 || 2.9 || align=center|
|-
|align="left"| || align="center"|F || align="left"|Long Beach State || align="center"|1 || align="center"| || 27 || 551 || 67 || 22 || 202 || 20.4 || 2.5 || 0.8 || 7.5 || align=center|
|-
|align="left"| || align="center"|F || align="left"|UNLV || align="center"|1 || align="center"| || 36 || 381 || 75 || 37 || 157 || 10.6 || 2.1 || 1.0 || 4.4 || align=center|
|-
|align="left"| || align="center"|G || align="left"|Texas || align="center"|1 || align="center"| || 80 || 1,139 || 163 || 60 || 403 || 14.2 || 2.0 || 0.8 || 5.0 || align=center|
|-
|align="left"| || align="center"|G/F || align="left"|Indiana || align="center"|1 || align="center"| || 70 || 1,280 || 195 || 124 || 491 || 18.3 || 2.8 || 1.8 || 7.0 || align=center|
|-
|align="left"| || align="center"|G || align="left"|Oakland || align="center"|1 || align="center"| || 2 || 6 || 4 || 0 || 2 || 3.0 || 2.0 || 0.0 || 1.0 || align=center|
|-
|align="left"| || align="center"|G || align="left"|Northwestern || align="center"|2 || align="center"|– || 103 || 1,031 || 126 || 94 || 287 || 10.0 || 1.2 || 0.9 || 2.8 || align=center|
|-
|align="left"| || align="center"|F/C || align="left"|Saint Louis || align="center"|4 || align="center"|– || 312 || 7,576 || 1,968 || 538 || 3,851 || 24.3 || 6.3 || 1.7 || 12.3 || align=center|
|-
|align="left"| || align="center"|G/F || align="left"|Villanova || align="center"|7 || align="center"|– || 485 || 12,985 || 1,686 || 1,698 || 4,120 || 26.8 || 3.5 || 3.5 || 8.5 || align=center|
|-
|align="left"| || align="center"|F || align="left"|Miami (OH) || align="center"|1 || align="center"| || 63 || 1,460 || 183 || 94 || 547 || 23.2 || 2.9 || 1.5 || 8.7 || align=center|
|-
|align="left" bgcolor="#FFCC00"|+ || align="center"|F/C || align="left"|La Salle || align="center"|7 || align="center"|– || 476 || 13,432 || 5,200 || 918 || 7,124 || 32.9 || 10.9 || 1.9 || 15.0 || align=center|
|-
|align="left"| || align="center"|F || align="left"|Fresno State || align="center"|1 || align="center"| || 36 || 261 || 53 || 14 || 44 || 7.3 || 1.5 || 0.4 || 1.2 || align=center|
|-
|align="left"| || align="center"|F/C || align="left"|South Carolina || align="center"|2 || align="center"|– || 49 || 755 || 274 || 40 || 222 || 15.4 || 5.6 || 0.8 || 4.5 || align=center|
|-
|align="left"| || align="center"|F/C || align="left"|Hamline || align="center"|1 || align="center"| || 16 || 151 || 32 || 4 || 45 || 9.4 || 2.0 || 0.3 || 2.8 || align=center|
|-
|align="left"| || align="center"|G || align="left"|Pepperdine || align="center"|1 || align="center"| || 15 || 248 || 42 || 28 || 60 || 16.5 || 2.8 || 1.9 || 4.0 || align=center|
|}

G to H

|-
|align="left" bgcolor="#FFFF99"|^ || align="center"|F/C || align="left"|Truman || align="center"|1 || align="center"| || 72 || 1,990 || 749 || 86 || 1,072 || 27.6 || 10.4 || 1.2 || 14.9 || align=center|
|-
|align="left" bgcolor="#CCFFCC"|x || align="center"|G || align="left"|Saint Joseph's || align="center"|2 || align="center"|– || 138 || 2,608 || 263 || 143 || 1,032 || 18.9 || 1.9 || 1.0 || 7.5 || align=center|
|-
|align="left"| || align="center"|F || align="left"|Oregon State || align="center"|1 || align="center"| || 25 || 302 || 78 || 15 || 169 || 12.1 || 3.1 || 0.6 || 6.8 || align=center|
|-
|align="left"| || align="center"|G || align="left"|Syracuse || align="center"|1 || align="center"| || 9 || 32 || 3 || 2 || 4 || 3.6 || 0.3 || 0.2 || 0.4 || align=center|
|-
|align="left"| || align="center"|G/F || align="left"|Virginia || align="center"|2 || align="center"|– || 49 || 811 || 147 || 44 || 375 || 16.6 || 3.0 || 0.9 || 7.7 || align=center|
|-
|align="left"| || align="center"|F || align="left"|USC Upstate || align="center"|1 || align="center"| || 32 || 161 || 40 || 5 || 48 || 5.0 || 1.3 || 0.2 || 1.5 || align=center|
|-
|align="left"| || align="center"|G/F || align="left"|Ole Miss || align="center"|1 || align="center"| || 56 || 777 || 139 || 68 || 296 || 13.9 || 2.5 || 1.2 || 5.3 || align=center|
|-
|align="left"| || align="center"|G || align="left"|Houston || align="center"|1 || align="center"| || 9 || 55 || 8 || 0 || 18 || 6.1 || 0.9 || 0.0 || 2.0 || align=center|
|-
|align="left"| || align="center"|G || align="left"|UConn || align="center"|3 || align="center"|– || 196 || 5,259 || 435 || 464 || 2,424 || 26.8 || 2.2 || 2.4 || 12.4 || align=center|
|-
|align="left"| || align="center"|G || align="left"|Georgia || align="center"|1 || align="center"| || 45 || 311 || 22 || 41 || 90 || 6.9 || 0.5 || 0.9 || 2.0 || align=center|
|-
|align="left"| || align="center"|G || align="left"|Michigan || align="center"|1 || align="center"| || 27 || 431 || 40 || 63 || 179 || 16.0 || 1.5 || 2.3 || 6.6 || align=center|
|-
|align="left"| || align="center"|F/C || align="left"|UNLV || align="center"|1 || align="center"| || 80 || 1,792 || 653 || 62 || 631 || 22.4 || 8.2 || 0.8 || 7.9 || align=center|
|-
|align="left"| || align="center"|F/C || align="left"|UCLA || align="center"|1 || align="center"| || 37 || 205 || 78 || 12 || 60 || 5.5 || 2.1 || 0.3 || 1.6 || align=center|
|-
|align="left" bgcolor="#FBCEB1"|* || align="center"|F || align="left"|Oklahoma || align="center"|2 || align="center"|– || 100 || 3,453 || 731 || 557 || 2,337 || 34.5 || 7.3 || 5.6 || bgcolor="#CFECEC"|23.4 || align=center|
|-
|align="left"| || align="center"|G || align="left"|Duke || align="center"|1 || align="center"| || 26 || 663 || 86 || 69 || 309 || 25.5 || 3.3 || 2.7 || 11.9 || align=center|
|-
|align="left"| || align="center"|G || align="left"|St. Bonaventure || align="center"|1 || align="center"| || 4 || 25 || 4 || 8 || 7 || 6.3 || 1.0 || 2.0 || 1.8 || align=center|
|-
|align="left"| || align="center"|F || align="left"|NYU || align="center"|3 || align="center"|– || 122 || 4,063 || 1,309 || 157 || 2,113 || 33.3 || 10.7 || 1.3 || 17.3 || align=center|
|-
|align="left"| || align="center"|F/C || align="left"|Michigan State || align="center"|1 || align="center"| || 47 || 651 || 179 || 21 || 273 || 13.9 || 3.8 || 0.4 || 5.8 || align=center|
|-
|align="left"| || align="center"|G/F || align="left"|Santa Clara || align="center"|1 || align="center"| || 34 ||  ||  || 87 || 320 ||  ||  || 2.6 || 9.4 || align=center|
|-
|align="left"| || align="center"|F || align="left"|Texas Tech || align="center"|2 || align="center"|– || 101 || 759 || 128 || 21 || 142 || 7.5 || 1.3 || 0.2 || 1.4 || align=center|
|-
|align="left"| || align="center"|G/F || align="left"|Indiana || align="center"|1 || align="center"| || 10 ||  ||  || 3 || 42 ||  ||  || 0.3 || 4.2 || align=center|
|-
|align="left" bgcolor="#FFCC00"|+ (#32) || align="center"|G/F || align="left"|UConn || align="center"|9 || align="center"|– || 631 || 21,679 || 2,120 || 2,419 || 11,582 || 34.4 || 3.4 || 3.8 || 18.4 || align=center|
|-
|align="left"| || align="center"|G || align="left"|UCLA || align="center"|1 || align="center"| || 72 || 1,116 || 107 || 192 || 333 || 15.5 || 1.5 || 2.7 || 4.6 || align=center|
|-
|align="left" bgcolor="#FFFF99"|^ || align="center"|F/C || align="left"|USC || align="center"|1 || align="center"| ||  ||  ||  ||  ||  ||  ||  ||  ||  || align=center|
|-
|align="left"| || align="center"|C || align="left"|Martin Luther King HS (MI) || align="center"|3 || align="center"|– || 191 || 5,224 || 1,771 || 325 || 1,774 || 27.4 || 9.3 || 1.7 || 9.3 || align=center|
|-
|align="left"| || align="center"|F || align="left"|Michigan || align="center"|1 || align="center"| || 38 || 310 || 34 || 20 || 142 || 8.2 || 0.9 || 0.5 || 3.7 || align=center|
|-
|align="left"| || align="center"|G/F || align="left"|Texas || align="center"|1 || align="center"| || 14 ||  || 30 || 9 || 67 ||  || 2.1 || 0.6 || 4.8 || align=center|
|-
|align="left"| || align="center"|F || align="left"|Richmond || align="center"|1 || align="center"| || 5 || 35 || 1 || 0 || 13 || 7.0 || 0.2 || 0.0 || 2.6 || align=center|
|-
|align="left"| || align="center"|C || align="left"|Kentucky || align="center"|1 || align="center"| || 32 || 317 || 76 || 15 || 93 || 9.9 || 2.4 || 0.5 || 2.9 || align=center|
|-
|align="left"| || align="center"|F/C || align="left"|Oklahoma State || align="center"|2 || align="center"|– || 74 ||  || 44 || 137 || 517 ||  || 3.7 || 1.9 || 7.0 || align=center|
|-
|align="left"| || align="center"|G || align="left"|Tulsa || align="center"|1 || align="center"| || 3 || 7 || 2 || 0 || 4 || 2.3 || 0.7 || 0.0 || 1.3 || align=center|
|-
|align="left"| || align="center"|F || align="left"|Tennessee || align="center"|3 || align="center"|– || 157 || 5,033 || 828 || 306 || 2,636 || 32.1 || 5.3 || 1.9 || 16.8 || align=center|
|-
|align="left"| || align="center"|F/C || align="left"|Arkansas || align="center"|2 || align="center"|– || 67 || 279 || 60 || 15 || 90 || 4.2 || 0.9 || 0.2 || 1.3 || align=center|
|-
|align="left"| || align="center"|G || align="left"|Illinois State || align="center"|1 || align="center"| || 4 || 28 || 6 || 4 || 18 || 7.0 || 1.5 || 1.0 || 4.5 || align=center|
|-
|align="left"| || align="center"|F || align="left"|Georgia || align="center"|1 || align="center"| || 82 || 1,287 || 178 || 62 || 552 || 15.7 || 2.2 || 0.8 || 6.7 || align=center|
|-
|align="left"| || align="center"|C || align="left"|Idaho State || align="center"|1 || align="center"| || 26 || 412 || 100 || 24 || 117 || 15.8 || 3.8 || 0.9 || 4.5 || align=center|
|-
|align="left"| || align="center"|G || align="left"|Northwestern || align="center"|1 || align="center"| || 3 || 7 || 0 || 0 || 3 || 2.3 || 0.0 || 0.0 || 1.0 || align=center|
|-
|align="left"| || align="center"|G || align="left"|VCU || align="center"|3 || align="center"|– || 77 || 789 || 74 || 128 || 255 || 10.2 || 1.0 || 1.7 || 3.3 || align=center|
|-
|align="left"| || align="center"|C || align="left"|Rice || align="center"|2 || align="center"|– || 76 ||  ||  || 94 || 531 ||  ||  || 1.2 || 7.0 || align=center|
|-
|align="left"| || align="center"|G || align="left"|Kansas State || align="center"|2 || align="center"|– || 27 || 90 || 2 || 7 || 40 || 3.3 || 0.1 || 0.3 || 1.5 || align=center|
|-
|align="left"| || align="center"|F || align="left"|Argentina || align="center"|2 || align="center"|– || 87 || 829 || 144 || 36 || 309 || 9.5 || 1.7 || 0.4 || 3.6 || align=center|
|-
|align="left"| || align="center"|G/F || align="left"|Villanova || align="center"|1 || align="center"| || 80 || 2,270 || 211 || 148 || 1,094 || 28.4 || 2.6 || 1.9 || 13.7 || align=center|
|-
|align="left"| || align="center"|F || align="left"|USC || align="center"|3 || align="center"|– || 175 || 3,729 || 1,037 || 231 || 986 || 21.3 || 5.9 || 1.3 || 5.6 || align=center|
|-
|align="left"| || align="center"|F/C || align="left"|Kansas || align="center"|1 || align="center"| || 29 || 564 || 164 || 28 || 248 || 19.4 || 5.7 || 1.0 || 8.6 || align=center|
|-
|align="left" bgcolor="#FFFF99"|^ || align="center"|G/F || align="left"|Duke || align="center"|6 || align="center"|– || 435 || 17,007 || 3,417 || 2,720 || 9,393 || 39.1 || 7.9 || 6.3 || 21.6 || align=center|
|-
|align="left"| || align="center"|G || align="left"|Villanova || align="center"|2 || align="center"|– || 77 || 764 || 78 || 60 || 279 || 9.9 || 1.0 || 0.8 || 3.6 || align=center|
|-
|align="left"| || align="center"|F || align="left"|Tennessee || align="center"|1 || align="center"| || 7 || 22 || 3 || 1 || 16 || 3.1 || 0.4 || 0.1 || 2.3 || align=center|
|-
|align="left"| || align="center"|G || align="left"|Arizona State || align="center"|1 || align="center"| || 32 || 216 || 22 || 62 || 59 || 6.8 || 0.7 || 1.9 || 1.8 || align=center|
|-
|align="left"| || align="center"|F || align="left"|St. Bonaventure || align="center"|1 || align="center"| || 25 || 154 || 45 || 6 || 69 || 6.2 || 1.8 || 0.2 || 2.8 || align=center|
|-
|align="left"| || align="center"|G/F || align="left"|Cincinnati || align="center"|1 || align="center"| ||  ||  ||  ||  ||  ||  ||  ||  ||  || align=center|
|-
|align="left"| || align="center"|F || align="left"|George Washington || align="center"|2 || align="center"|– || 105 || 2,109 || 550 || 96 || 779 || 20.1 || 5.2 || 0.9 || 7.4 || align=center|
|-
|align="left"| || align="center"|F || align="left"|Dayton || align="center"|1 || align="center"| || 7 || 43 || 4 || 1 || 22 || 6.1 || 0.6 || 0.1 || 3.1 || align=center|
|-
|align="left" bgcolor="#FFFF99"|^ || align="center"|F/C || align="left"|Washington || align="center"|4 || align="center"|– || 147 || 3,429 || 880 || 291 || 1,578 || 23.3 || 6.0 || 2.0 || 10.7 || align=center|
|-
|align="left"| || align="center"|G || align="left"|Tennessee || align="center"|3 || align="center"|– || 237 || 6,587 || 587 || 514 || 3,386 || 27.8 || 2.5 || 2.2 || 14.3 || align=center|
|-
|align="left"| || align="center"|F || align="left"|Austin Peay || align="center"|1 || align="center"| || 11 || 91 || 34 || 4 || 49 || 8.3 || 3.1 || 0.4 || 4.5 || align=center|
|-
|align="left" bgcolor="#FFFF99"|^ || align="center"|F || align="left"|Mississippi State || align="center"|5 || align="center"|– || 387 || 13,826 || 4,583 || 882 || 8,182 || 35.7 || 11.8 || 2.3 || 21.1 || align=center|
|-
|align="left"| || align="center"|F/C || align="left"|Michigan || align="center"|3 || align="center"|– || 196 || 4,582 || 1,178 || 287 || 2,266 || 23.4 || 6.0 || 1.5 || 11.6 || align=center|
|-
|align="left"| || align="center"|G || align="left"|Jackson State || align="center"|12 || align="center"|–– || 703 || 18,574 || 1,646 || 2,038 || 6,292 || 26.4 || 2.3 || 2.9 || 9.0 || align=center|
|-
|align="left" bgcolor="#FFCC00"|+ || align="center"|F/C || align="left"|BYU || align="center"|4 || align="center"|– || 282 || 10,681 || 2,427 || 847 || 3,287 || 37.9 || 8.6 || 3.0 || 11.7 || align=center|
|}

I to J

|-
|align="left"| || align="center"|F || align="left"|Turkey || align="center"|1 || align="center"| || 52 || 1,434 || 282 || 55 || 589 || 27.6 || 5.4 || 1.1 || 11.3 || align=center|
|-
|align="left"| || align="center"|C || align="left"|California || align="center"|2 || align="center"|– || 103 || 1,329 || 438 || 84 || 397 || 12.9 || 4.3 || 0.8 || 3.9 || align=center|
|-
|align="left" bgcolor="#FFFF99"|^ || align="center"|G || align="left"|Georgetown || align="center"|1 || align="center"| || 54 || 1,970 || 165 || 263 || 939 || 36.5 || 3.1 || 4.9 || 17.4 || align=center|
|-
|align="left"| || align="center"|G || align="left"|Detroit Mercy || align="center"|1 || align="center"| || 7 || 73 || 11 || 4 || 7 || 10.4 || 1.6 || 0.6 || 1.0 || align=center|
|-
|align="left" bgcolor="#CCFFCC"|x || align="center"|G || align="left"|Boston College || align="center"|5 || align="center"|– || 285 || 8,208 || 834 || 1,592 || 4,633 || 28.8 || 2.9 || 5.6 || 16.3 || align=center|
|-
|align="left"| || align="center"|G || align="left"|Duquesne || align="center"|1 || align="center"| || 26 || 512 || 58 || 95 || 165 || 19.7 || 2.2 || 3.7 || 6.3 || align=center|
|-
|align="left"| || align="center"|G || align="left"|William Paterson || align="center"|1 || align="center"| || 15 || 104 || 9 || 9 || 42 || 6.9 || 0.6 || 0.6 || 2.8 || align=center|
|-
|align="left"| || align="center"|G || align="left"|Oak Hill Academy (VA) || align="center"|3 || align="center"|– || 144 || 4,317 || 394 || 951 || 2,030 || 30.0 || 2.7 || 6.6 || 14.1 || align=center|
|-
|align="left"| || align="center"|F || align="left"|Sweden || align="center"|5 || align="center"|– || 303 || 6,036 || 1,288 || 224 || 2,185 || 19.9 || 4.3 || 0.7 || 7.2 || align=center|
|-
|align="left"| || align="center"|F/C || align="left"|Westchester HS (CA) || align="center"|4 || align="center"|– || 135 || 1,838 || 508 || 55 || 505 || 13.6 || 3.8 || 0.4 || 3.7 || align=center|
|-
|align="left"| || align="center"|G || align="left"|Huntington || align="center"|4 || align="center"|– || 169 || 2,295 || 498 || 465 || 1,368 || 33.3 || 3.6 || 2.8 || 8.1 || align=center|
|-
|align="left"| || align="center"|F || align="left"|East Texas State || align="center"|1 || align="center"| || 2 || 10 || 2 || 0 || 0 || 5.0 || 1.0 || 0.0 || 0.0 || align=center|
|-
|align="left"| || align="center"|F || align="left"|Minnesota || align="center"|1 || align="center"| || 6 || 60 || 14 || 1 || 31 || 10.0 || 2.3 || 0.2 || 5.2 || align=center|
|-
|align="left"| || align="center"|F || align="left"|Arizona || align="center"|4 || align="center"|– || 267 || 5,913 || 922 || 395 || 1,889 || 22.1 || 3.5 || 1.5 || 7.1 || align=center|
|-
|align="left"| (#15) || align="center"|G || align="left"|Baylor || align="center"|10 || align="center"|– || 798 || 20,218 || 2,491 || 2,661 || 10,146 || 25.3 || 3.1 || 3.3 || 12.7 || align=center|
|-
|align="left"| || align="center"|F/C || align="left"|Wake Forest || align="center"|1 || align="center"| || 16 || 137 || 30 || 10 || 24 || 8.6 || 1.9 || 0.6 || 1.5 || align=center|
|-
|align="left"| || align="center"|F/C || align="left"|Albany State || align="center"|1 || align="center"| || 42 || 877 || 235 || 29 || 91 || 20.9 || 5.6 || 0.7 || 2.2 || align=center|
|-
|align="left"| || align="center"|G || align="left"|Houston || align="center"|1 || align="center"| || 67 || 1,083 || 103 || 140 || 340 || 16.2 || 1.5 || 2.1 || 5.1 || align=center|
|-
|align="left"| || align="center"|F/C || align="left"|Nevada || align="center"|2 || align="center"|– || 97 || 1,838 || 478 || 109 || 784 || 18.9 || 4.9 || 1.1 || 8.1 || align=center|
|-
|align="left"| || align="center"|F || align="left"|Albany State || align="center"|1 || align="center"| || 47 || 418 || 128 || 15 || 129 || 8.9 || 2.7 || 0.3 || 2.7 || align=center|
|-
|align="left"| || align="center"|G || align="left"|Villanova || align="center"|1 || align="center"| || 1 || 19 || 0 || 2 || 8 || 19.0 || 0.0 || 2.0 || 8.0 || align=center|
|-
|align="left"| || align="center"|G || align="left"|Northwestern || align="center"|5 || align="center"|– || 272 || 4,568 || 767 || 545 || 2,016 || 16.8 || 2.8 || 2.0 || 7.4 || align=center|
|-
|align="left"| || align="center"|F/C || align="left"|Whitworth || align="center"|2 || align="center"|– || 118 || 2,881 || 871 || 115 || 1,442 || 24.4 || 7.4 || 1.0 || 12.2 || align=center|
|-
|align="left"| || align="center"|G/F || align="left"|Utah || align="center"|1 || align="center"| || 30 || 251 || 34 || 14 || 79 || 8.4 || 1.1 || 0.5 || 2.6 || align=center|
|}

K to L

|-
|align="left"| || align="center"|F || align="left"|Michigan State || align="center"|3 || align="center"|– || 86 || 2,070 || 435 || 165 || 1,114 || 24.1 || 5.1 || 1.9 || 13.0 || align=center|
|-
|align="left"| || align="center"|G || align="left"|Central Michigan || align="center"|1 || align="center"| || 46 || 298 || 31 || 18 || 85 || 6.5 || 0.7 || 0.4 || 1.8 || align=center|
|-
|align="left" bgcolor="#CCFFCC"|x || align="center"|G || align="left"|Duke || align="center"|2 || align="center"|– || 136 || 2,900 || 359 || 238 || 1,171 || 21.3 || 2.6 || 1.8 || 8.6 || align=center|
|-
|align="left"| || align="center"|G/F || align="left"|St. Bonaventure || align="center"|3 || align="center"|– || 131 || 2,715 || 497 || 284 || 967 || 20.7 || 3.8 || 2.2 || 7.4 || align=center|
|-
|align="left"| || align="center"|F/C || align="left"|Loyola (IL) || align="center"|4 || align="center"|– || 250 || 3,130 || 1,198 || 611 || 1,936 || 26.5 || 6.4 || 2.4 || 7.7 || align=center|
|-
|align="left"| || align="center"|G || align="left"|Syracuse || align="center"|2 || align="center"|– || 53 || 504 || 51 || 65 || 124 || 9.5 || 1.0 || 1.2 || 2.3 || align=center|
|-
|align="left"| || align="center"|G || align="left"|Xavier || align="center"|1 || align="center"| || 10 || 50 || 7 || 5 || 16 || 5.0 || 0.7 || 0.5 || 1.6 || align=center|
|-
|align="left"| || align="center"|F/C || align="left"|Rice || align="center"|1 || align="center"| || 37 ||  ||  || 51 || 254 ||  ||  || 1.4 || 6.9 || align=center|
|-
|align="left"| || align="center"|G/F || align="left"|Illinois || align="center"|1 || align="center"| || 14 ||  ||  || 12 || 69 ||  ||  || 0.9 || 4.9 || align=center|
|-
|align="left"| || align="center"|G/F || align="left"|Notre Dame || align="center"|2 || align="center"|– || 113 ||  ||  || 177 || 802 ||  ||  || 1.6 || 7.1 || align=center|
|-
|align="left"| || align="center"|G || align="left"|Indiana State || align="center"|2 || align="center"|– || 80 ||  || 183 || 110 || 593 ||  || 3.0 || 1.4 || 7.4 || align=center|
|-
|align="left"| || align="center"|G || align="left"|Kentucky || align="center"|2 || align="center"|– || 141 || 4,494 || 458 || 554 || 1,846 || 31.9 || 3.2 || 3.9 || 13.1 || align=center|
|-
|align="left"| || align="center"|G || align="left"|Dayton || align="center"|1 || align="center"| || 44 || 665 || 58 || 116 || 181 || 15.1 || 1.3 || 2.6 || 4.1 || align=center|
|-
|align="left"| || align="center"|F || align="left"|Marquette || align="center"|2 || align="center"|– || 125 || 1,619 || 503 || 105 || 862 || 13.0 || 4.0 || 0.8 || 6.9 || align=center|
|-
|align="left"| || align="center"|G || align="left"|Bowling Green || align="center"|4 || align="center"|– || 296 || 8,147 || 721 || 1,131 || 2,957 || 27.5 || 2.4 || 3.8 || 10.0 || align=center|
|-
|align="left"| || align="center"|C || align="left"|Ukraine || align="center"|1 || align="center"| || 25 || 224 || 45 || 9 || 77 || 9.0 || 1.8 || 0.4 || 3.1 || align=center|
|-
|align="left"| || align="center"|F/C || align="left"|Duke || align="center"|2 || align="center"|– || 98 || 2,780 || 607 || 210 || 1,123 || 28.4 || 6.2 || 2.1 || 11.5 || align=center|
|-
|align="left" bgcolor="#FFCC00"|+ (#40) || align="center"|C || align="left"|Notre Dame || align="center"|13 || align="center"|– || 937 || 30,602 || bgcolor="#CFECEC"|9,430 || 1,923 || 12,665 || 32.7 || 10.1 || 2.1 || 13.5 || align=center|
|-
|align="left" bgcolor="#FFFF99"|^ (#16) || align="center"|C || align="left"|St. Bonaventure || align="center"|10 || align="center"|– || 681 || 24,640 || 8,063 || 2,256 || 15,488 || 36.2 || 11.8 || 3.3 || 22.7 || align=center|
|-
|align="left"| || align="center"|G || align="left"|Nebraska || align="center"|2 || align="center"|– || 101 || 2,583 || 285 || 235 || 937 || 25.6 || 2.8 || 2.3 || 9.3 || align=center|
|-
|align="left"| || align="center"|C || align="left"|McNeese State || align="center"|1 || align="center"| || 3 || 19 || 4 || 1 || 12 || 6.3 || 1.3 || 0.3 || 4.0 || align=center|
|-
|align="left"| || align="center"|F/C || align="left"|Wyoming || align="center"|2 || align="center"|– || 75 || 778 || 208 || 15 || 269 || 10.4 || 2.8 || 0.2 || 3.6 || align=center|
|-
|align="left"| || align="center"|G/F || align="left"|Michigan || align="center"|2 || align="center"|– || 149 || 3,086 || 839 || 153 || 1,467 || 20.7 || 5.6 || 1.0 || 9.8 || align=center|
|-
|align="left"| || align="center"|G || align="left"|Oregon || align="center"|3 || align="center"|– || 194 || 4,099 || 465 || 848 || 844 || 21.1 || 2.4 || 4.4 || 4.4 || align=center|
|-
|align="left"| || align="center"|F || align="left"|Wisconsin || align="center"|3 || align="center"|– || 124 || 2,482 || 531 || 130 || 966 || 20.0 || 4.3 || 1.0 || 7.8 || align=center|
|-
|align="left"| || align="center"|F || align="left"|Wichita State || align="center"|2 || align="center"|– || 142 || 2,625 || 777 || 161 || 929 || 18.5 || 5.5 || 1.1 || 6.5 || align=center|
|-
|align="left"| || align="center"|G/F || align="left"|La Salle || align="center"|2 || align="center"| || 54 || 316 || 51 || 14 || 83 || 5.9 || 0.9 || 0.3 || 1.5 || align=center|
|-
|align="left"| || align="center"|F || align="left"|Illinois || align="center"|1 || align="center"| || 35 || 274 || 56 || 15 || 100 || 7.8 || 1.6 || 0.4 || 2.9 || align=center|
|-
|align="left"| || align="center"|G || align="left"|Vanderbilt || align="center"|1 || align="center"| || 38 || 272 || 26 || 25 || 126 || 7.2 || 0.7 || 0.7 || 3.3 || align=center|
|-
|align="left" bgcolor="#FFFF99"|^ || align="center"|F/C || align="left"|West Virginia State || align="center"|2 || align="center"|– || 140 || 3,406 || 822 || 179 || 1,207 || 24.3 || 5.9 || 1.3 || 8.6 || align=center|
|-
|align="left"| || align="center"|G || align="left"|New Mexico State || align="center"|1 || align="center"| || 1 || 4 || 0 || 0 || 0 || 4.0 || 0.0 || 0.0 || 0.0 || align=center|
|-
|align="left"| || align="center"|F || align="left"|Eastern Michigan || align="center"|2 || align="center"|– || 105 || 1,905 || 372 || 64 || 467 || 18.1 || 3.5 || 0.6 || 4.4 || align=center|
|-
|align="left"| || align="center"|G/F || align="left"|Detroit Mercy || align="center"|10 || align="center"|–– || 608 || 16,226 || 1,857 || 1,136 || 9,023 || 26.7 || 3.1 || 1.9 || 14.8 || align=center|
|-
|align="left"| || align="center"|G || align="left"|Wake Forest || align="center"|2 || align="center"| || 41 || 223 || 26 || 29 || 140 || 5.4 || 0.6 || 0.7 || 3.4 || align=center|
|-
|align="left"| || align="center"|G || align="left"|St. John's || align="center"|2 || align="center"|– || 58 || 847 || 109 || 104 || 365 || 14.6 || 1.9 || 1.8 || 6.3 || align=center|
|-
|align="left"| || align="center"|G || align="left"|NC State || align="center"|1 || align="center"| || 6 || 31 || 1 || 8 || 4 || 5.2 || 0.2 || 1.3 || 0.7 || align=center|
|-
|align="left"| || align="center"|G || align="left"|Oklahoma State || align="center"|1 || align="center"| || 21 || 272 || 16 || 60 || 98 || 13.0 || 0.8 || 2.9 || 4.7 || align=center|
|-
|align="left"| || align="center"|G || align="left"|Michigan State || align="center"|1 || align="center"| || 1 || 6 || 3 || 1 || 2 || 6.0 || 3.0 || 1.0 || 2.0 || align=center|
|}

M

|-
|align="left"| || align="center"|F || align="left"|Florida || align="center"|1 || align="center"| || 23 || 135 || 34 || 5 || 46 || 5.9 || 1.5 || 0.2 || 2.0 || align=center|
|-
|align="left"| || align="center"|G || align="left"|Temple || align="center"|4 || align="center"|– || 120 || 1,447 || 137 || 123 || 486 || 12.1 || 1.1 || 1.0 || 4.1 || align=center|
|-
|align="left"| || align="center"|F || align="left"|Duke || align="center"|1 || align="center"| || 18 || 257 || 25 || 19 || 95 || 14.3 || 1.4 || 1.1 || 5.3 || align=center|
|-
|align="left"| || align="center"|C || align="left"|Georgetown || align="center"|2 || align="center"|– || 39 ||  ||  || 84 || 358 ||  ||  || 2.2 || 9.2 || align=center|
|-
|align="left"| || align="center"|F/C || align="left"|Hampton || align="center"|6 || align="center"|–– || 363 || 7,403 || 2,096 || 242 || 2,215 || 20.4 || 5.8 || 0.7 || 6.1 || align=center|
|-
|align="left" bgcolor="#CCFFCC"|x || align="center"|F/C || align="left"|South Sudan || align="center"|1 || align="center"| || 29 || 563 || 106 || 27 || 159 || 19.4 || 3.7 || 0.9 || 5.5 || align=center|
|-
|align="left"| || align="center"|F || align="left"|San Diego State || align="center"|1 || align="center"| || 10 || 162 || 28 || 14 || 26 || 16.2 || 2.8 || 1.4 || 2.6 || align=center|
|-
|align="left"| || align="center"|F/C || align="left"|Kansas || align="center"|1 || align="center"| || 13 || 89 || 18 || 7 || 34 || 6.8 || 1.4 || 0.5 || 2.6 || align=center|
|-
|align="left"| || align="center"|G || align="left"|Utah || align="center"|1 || align="center"| || 5 || 14 || 3 || 0 || 4 || 2.8 || 0.6 || 0.0 || 0.8 || align=center|
|-
|align="left"| || align="center"|C || align="left"|Serbia || align="center"|2 || align="center"|– || 54 || 464 || 187 || 23 || 309 || 8.6 || 3.5 || 0.4 || 5.7 || align=center|
|-
|align="left"| || align="center"|G || align="left"|Eastern Michigan || align="center"|3 || align="center"|– || 61 || 746 || 86 || 94 || 225 || 12.2 || 1.4 || 1.5 || 3.7 || align=center|
|-
|align="left"| || align="center"|G/F || align="left"|Western Kentucky || align="center"|1 || align="center"| || 9 || 66 || 8 || 4 || 21 || 7.3 || 0.9 || 0.4 || 2.3 || align=center|
|-
|align="left"| || align="center"|F || align="left"|Kansas State || align="center"|1 || align="center"| || 23 || 198 || 20 || 11 || 36 || 8.6 || 0.9 || 0.5 || 1.6 || align=center|
|-
|align="left"| || align="center"|F || align="left"|Cincinnati || align="center"|8 || align="center"|– || 523 || 10,013 || 2,287 || 238 || 3,169 || 19.1 || 4.4 || 0.5 || 6.1 || align=center|
|-
|align="left"| || align="center"|F || align="left"|Indiana || align="center"|1 || align="center"| || 9 || 155 || 26 || 12 || 59 || 17.2 || 2.9 || 1.3 || 6.6 || align=center|
|-
|align="left" bgcolor="#FFFF99"|^ || align="center"|F/C || align="left"|North Carolina || align="center"|2 || align="center"|– || 64 || 2,265 || 508 || 220 || 1,294 || 35.4 || 7.9 || 3.4 || 20.2 || align=center|
|-
|align="left"| || align="center"|F || align="left"|Morehead State || align="center"|1 || align="center"| || 26 || 129 || 30 || 6 || 30 || 5.0 || 1.2 || 0.2 || 1.2 || align=center|
|-
|align="left"| || align="center"|F/C || align="left"|Alabama || align="center"|5 || align="center"|– || 381 || 9,410 || 2,687 || 405 || 3,321 || 24.7 || 7.1 || 1.1 || 8.7 || align=center|
|-
|align="left"| || align="center"|G || align="left"|Central Michigan || align="center"|1 || align="center"| || 36 || 1,012 || 50 || 162 || 422 || 28.1 || 1.4 || 4.5 || 11.7 || align=center|
|-
|align="left" bgcolor="#FFFF99"|^ || align="center"|G/F || align="left"|Mount Zion Christian Academy (NC) || align="center"|1 || align="center"| || 72 || 1,686 || 251 || 252 || 574 || 23.4 || 3.5 || 3.5 || 8.0 || align=center|
|-
|align="left" bgcolor="#FFFF99"|^ || align="center"|G || align="left"|St. John's || align="center"|3 || align="center"|– || 208 || 5,840 || 840 || 1,255 || 1,693 || 28.1 || 4.0 || 6.0 || 8.1 || align=center|
|-
|align="left"| || align="center"|G || align="left"|Temple || align="center"|2 || align="center"|– || 66 || 1,322 || 196 || 115 || 372 || 20.0 || 3.0 || 1.7 || 5.6 || align=center|
|-
|align="left"| || align="center"|F/C || align="left"|Drake || align="center"|2 || align="center"|– || 123 || 2,331 || 572 || 127 || 951 || 19.0 || 4.7 || 1.0 || 7.7 || align=center|
|-
|align="left"| || align="center"|F || align="left"|Bradley || align="center"|4 || align="center"|– || 215 || 3,942 || 1,267 || 179 || 1,831 || 18.3 || 5.9 || 0.8 || 8.5 || align=center|
|-
|align="left"| || align="center"|F/C || align="left"|Marquette || align="center"|1 || align="center"| || 11 || 46 || 10 || 3 || 29 || 4.2 || 0.9 || 0.3 || 2.6 || align=center|
|-
|align="left"| || align="center"|F || align="left"|NC State || align="center"|1 || align="center"| || 3 || 7 || 8 || 0 || 6 || 2.3 || 2.7 || 0.0 || 2.0 || align=center|
|-
|align="left"| || align="center"|G || align="left"|Kentucky || align="center"|2 || align="center"|– || 63 || 1,505 || 109 || 82 || 685 || 23.9 || 1.7 || 1.3 || 10.9 || align=center|
|-
|align="left"| || align="center"|F/C || align="left"|Tennessee || align="center"|1 || align="center"| || 43 ||  || 121 || 52 || 279 ||  || 2.8 || 1.2 || 6.5 || align=center|
|-
|align="left"| || align="center"|F/C || align="left"|Dayton || align="center"|3 || align="center"|– || 207 || 4,742 || 1,084 || 293 || 1,522 || 22.9 || 5.2 || 1.4 || 7.4 || align=center|
|-
|align="left"| || align="center"|G || align="left"|Auburn || align="center"|4 || align="center"|– || 291 || 6,090 || 671 || 585 || 2,987 || 20.9 || 2.3 || 2.0 || 10.3 || align=center|
|-
|align="left"| || align="center"|G/F || align="left"|Texas A&M || align="center"|1 || align="center"| || 27 || 475 || 50 || 28 || 165 || 17.6 || 1.9 || 1.0 || 6.1 || align=center|
|-
|align="left" bgcolor="#FFCC00"|+ || align="center"|G/F || align="left"|Seattle || align="center"|7 || align="center"|– || 497 || 13,890 || 1,673 || 1,094 || 7,419 || 27.9 || 3.4 || 2.2 || 14.9 || align=center|
|-
|align="left"| || align="center"|F/C || align="left"|Serbia || align="center"|3 || align="center"|– || 96 || 553 || 114 || 23 || 152 || 5.8 || 1.2 || 0.2 || 1.6 || align=center|
|-
|align="left"| || align="center"|C || align="left"|Arkansas || align="center"|1 || align="center"| || 64 || 1,558 || 475 || 93 || 545 || 24.3 || 7.4 || 1.5 || 8.5 || align=center|
|-
|align="left"| || align="center"|F || align="left"|Baylor || align="center"|1 || align="center"| || 4 || 58 || 8 || 5 || 12 || 14.5 || 2.0 || 1.3 || 3.0 || align=center|
|-
|align="left"| || align="center"|F || align="left"|Michigan || align="center"|6 || align="center"|– || 476 || 12,965 || 2,821 || 730 || 5,872 || 27.2 || 5.9 || 1.5 || 12.3 || align=center|
|-
|align="left"| || align="center"|F || align="left"|North Texas || align="center"|1 || align="center"| || 21 || 79 || 26 || 2 || 22 || 3.8 || 1.2 || 0.1 || 1.0 || align=center|
|-
|align="left"| || align="center"|F || align="left"|Toledo || align="center"|3 || align="center"|– || 61 || 1,111 || 251 || 53 || 446 || 18.2 || 4.1 || 0.9 || 7.3 || align=center|
|-
|align="left"| || align="center"|F/C || align="left"|Youngstown State || align="center"|1 || align="center"| || 20 ||  ||  || 27 || 173 ||  ||  || 1.4 || 8.7 || align=center|
|-
|align="left"| || align="center"|C || align="left"|Kentucky || align="center"|2 || align="center"|– || 72 || 1,001 || 302 || 15 || 355 || 13.9 || 4.2 || 0.2 || 4.9 || align=center|
|-
|align="left"| || align="center"|F/C || align="left"|Kansas || align="center"|2 || align="center"|– || 119 || 2,338 || 540 || 159 || 691 || 19.6 || 4.5 || 1.3 || 5.8 || align=center|
|-
|align="left" bgcolor="#FFCC00"|+ || align="center"|F || align="left"|Columbia || align="center"|1 || align="center"| || 32 || 958 || 228 || 51 || 370 || 29.9 || 7.1 || 1.6 || 11.6 || align=center|
|-
|align="left"| || align="center"|G || align="left"|Arizona || align="center"|5 || align="center"|– || 350 || 8,766 || 725 || 1,276 || 4,123 || 25.0 || 2.1 || 3.6 || 11.8 || align=center|
|-
|align="left"| || align="center"|F/C || align="left"|Georgetown || align="center"|5 || align="center"|– || 378 || 11,818 || 3,479 || 851 || 5,411 || 31.3 || 9.2 || 2.3 || 14.3 || align=center|
|-
|align="left"| || align="center"|G || align="left"|Westchester CC || align="center"|1 || align="center"| || 2 || 8 || 2 || 0 || 0 || 4.0 || 1.0 || 0.0 || 0.0 || align=center|
|-
|align="left"| || align="center"|C || align="left"|North Carolina || align="center"|4 || align="center"|– || 167 || 1,831 || 462 || 40 || 313 || 11.0 || 2.8 || 0.2 || 1.9 || align=center|
|-
|align="left"| || align="center"|F/C || align="left"|Nebraska || align="center"|4 || align="center"|– || 142 || 1,865 || 482 || 61 || 670 || 13.1 || 3.4 || 0.4 || 4.7 || align=center|
|-
|align="left"| || align="center"|F/C || align="left"|UTPA || align="center"|4 || align="center"|– || 239 || 6,065 || 2,126 || 261 || 2,274 || 25.4 || 8.9 || 1.1 || 9.5 || align=center|
|-
|align="left"| || align="center"|C || align="left"|West Virginia State || align="center"|1 || align="center"| || 9 || 25 || 2 || 1 || 10 || 2.8 || 0.2 || 0.1 || 1.1 || align=center|
|-
|align="left"| || align="center"|G/F || align="left"|Tulsa || align="center"|1 || align="center"| || 3 || 10 || 1 || 0 || 6 || 3.3 || 0.3 || 0.0 || 2.0 || align=center|
|-
|align="left"| || align="center"|F/C || align="left"|Oregon State || align="center"|1 || align="center"| || 67 || 805 || 278 || 78 || 143 || 12.0 || 4.1 || 1.2 || 2.1 || align=center|
|-
|align="left"| || align="center"|G/F || align="left"|Louisiana Tech || align="center"|5 || align="center"|– || 348 || 6,250 || 1,779 || 432 || 2,684 || 18.0 || 5.1 || 1.2 || 7.7 || align=center|
|-
|align="left"| || align="center"|F || align="left"|Arkansas || align="center"|1 || align="center"| || 25 || 102 || 12 || 4 || 55 || 4.1 || 0.5 || 0.2 || 2.2 || align=center|
|-
|align="left"| || align="center"|F || align="left"|Kansas || align="center"|2 || align="center"|– || 159 || 5,421 || 770 || 361 || 2,236 || 34.1 || 4.8 || 2.3 || 14.1 || align=center|
|-
|align="left"| || align="center"|F/C || align="left"|San Francisco || align="center"|4 || align="center"|– || 189 || 4,193 || 853 || 376 || 1,273 || 22.2 || 4.5 || 2.0 || 6.7 || align=center|
|-
|align="left"| || align="center"|F/C || align="left"|UC Irvine || align="center"|1 || align="center"| || 7 || 57 || 9 || 3 || 15 || 8.1 || 1.3 || 0.4 || 2.1 || align=center|
|-
|align="left"| || align="center"|G/F || align="left"|St. Bonaventure || align="center"|2 || align="center"| || 63 || 528 || 65 || 109 || 287 || 10.8 || 1.3 || 1.7 || 4.6 || align=center|
|-
|align="left"| || align="center"|G || align="left"|Shaw || align="center"|2 || align="center"|– || 88 || 1,824 || 149 || 251 || 607 || 20.7 || 1.7 || 2.9 || 6.9 || align=center|
|-
|align="left"| || align="center"|F/C || align="left"|Detroit Mercy || align="center"|1 || align="center"| || 35 || 311 || 102 || 12 || 98 || 8.9 || 2.9 || 0.3 || 2.8 || align=center|
|-
|align="left" bgcolor="#CCFFCC"|x || align="center"|G/F || align="left"|Kansas || align="center"|1 || align="center"| || 3 || 20 || 2 || 4 || 6 || 6.7 || 0.7 || 1.3 || 2.0 || align=center|
|}

N to O

|-
|align="left"| || align="center"|G || align="left"|Loyola (IL) || align="center"|1 || align="center"| || 14 ||  ||  || 18 || 13 ||  ||  || 1.3 || 0.9 || align=center|
|-
|align="left"| || align="center"|F || align="left"|Hawaii || align="center"|2 || align="center"|– || 71 || 450 || 108 || 30 || 149 || 6.3 || 1.5 || 0.4 || 2.1 || align=center|
|-
|align="left"| || align="center"|G || align="left"|Saint Joseph's || align="center"|1 || align="center"| || 7 || 116 || 8 || 23 || 26 || 16.6 || 1.1 || 3.3 || 3.7 || align=center|
|-
|align="left"| || align="center"|C || align="left"|NC State || align="center"|3 || align="center"|– || 83 || 431 || 126 || 9 || 132 || 5.2 || 1.5 || 0.1 || 1.6 || align=center|
|-
|align="left"| || align="center"|G || align="left"|Minnesota || align="center"|1 || align="center"| || 33 || 311 || 37 || 57 || 119 || 9.4 || 1.1 || 1.7 || 3.6 || align=center|
|-
|align="left"| || align="center"|F || align="left"|Georgia Tech || align="center"|1 || align="center"| || 34 || 331 || 81 || 17 || 40 || 9.7 || 2.4 || 0.5 || 1.2 || align=center|
|-
|align="left"| || align="center"|C || align="left"|Saint Louis || align="center"|1 || align="center"| || 16 || 123 || 41 || 9 || 48 || 7.7 || 2.6 || 0.6 || 3.0 || align=center|
|-
|align="left"| || align="center"|G/F || align="left"|Notre Dame || align="center"|2 || align="center"|– || 86 ||  ||  || 157 || 536 ||  ||  || 1.8 || 6.2 || align=center|
|-
|align="left"| || align="center"|F/C || align="left"|Arizona State || align="center"|1 || align="center"| || 28 || 277 || 54 || 7 || 96 || 9.9 || 1.9 || 0.3 || 3.4 || align=center|
|-
|align="left" bgcolor="#FFCC00"|+ || align="center"|G || align="left"|Louisville || align="center"|7 || align="center"|– || 411 || 9,212 || 1,075 || 1,344 || 3,276 || 22.4 || 2.6 || 3.3 || 8.0 || align=center|
|-
|align="left"| || align="center"|F || align="left"|Alcorn State || align="center"|5 || align="center"|– || 271 || 4,339 || 1,011 || 187 || 2,072 || 16.0 || 3.7 || 0.7 || 7.6 || align=center|
|-
|align="left"| || align="center"|G/F || align="left"|UCLA || align="center"|2 || align="center"|– || 48 || 399 || 67 || 29 || 120 || 8.3 || 1.4 || 0.6 || 2.5 || align=center|
|-
|align="left"| || align="center"|G || align="left"|Butler || align="center"|1 || align="center"| || 7 || 50 || 0 || 4 || 23 || 7.1 || 0.0 || 0.6 || 3.3 || align=center|
|-
|align="left" bgcolor="#FFCC00"|+ || align="center"|G || align="left"|Illinois || align="center"|4 || align="center"|– || 307 || 10,025 || 942 || 1,059 || 5,137 || 32.7 || 3.1 || 3.4 || 16.7 || align=center|
|-
|align="left"| || align="center"|F/C || align="left"|Turkey || align="center"|2 || align="center"|– || 143 || 2,946 || 756 || 140 || 1,176 || 20.6 || 5.3 || 1.0 || 8.2 || align=center|
|-
|align="left"| || align="center"|G || align="left"|Western Kentucky || align="center"|2 || align="center"|– || 127 ||  || 242 || 226 || 926 ||  || 3.6 || 1.8 || 7.3 || align=center|
|-
|align="left"| || align="center"|F/C || align="left"|Louisville || align="center"|1 || align="center"| || 10 || 70 || 11 || 7 || 20 || 7.0 || 1.1 || 0.7 || 2.0 || align=center|
|-
|align="left"| || align="center"|C || align="left"|Fordham || align="center"|1 || align="center"| || 13 || 56 || 10 || 3 || 17 || 4.3 || 0.8 || 0.2 || 1.3 || align=center|
|-
|align="left"| || align="center"|C || align="left"|Bowling Green || align="center"|2 || align="center"|– || 56 || 63 || 315 || 42 || 435 || 9.0 || 5.6 || 0.8 || 7.8 || align=center|
|-
|align="left"| || align="center"|G/F || align="left"|Syracuse || align="center"|1 || align="center"| || 45 || 793 || 205 || 55 || 198 || 17.6 || 4.6 || 1.2 || 4.4 || align=center|
|-
|align="left"| || align="center"|F/C || align="left"|South Carolina || align="center"|1 || align="center"| || 49 || 725 || 186 || 44 || 207 || 14.8 || 3.8 || 0.9 || 4.2 || align=center|
|}

P to R

|-
|align="left"| || align="center"|C || align="left"|Georgia || align="center"|1 || align="center"| || 68 || 878 || 265 || 91 || 267 || 12.9 || 3.9 || 1.3 || 3.9 || align=center|
|-
|align="left"| || align="center"|G || align="left"|Fordham || align="center"|1 || align="center"| || 11 || 110 || 9 || 11 || 33 || 10.0 || 0.8 || 1.0 || 3.0 || align=center|
|-
|align="left"| || align="center"|F/C || align="left"|Toledo || align="center"|1 || align="center"| || 59 || 559 || 159 || 51 || 120 || 9.5 || 2.7 || 0.9 || 2.0 || align=center|
|-
|align="left"| || align="center"|F/C || align="left"|Manhattan || align="center"|1 || align="center"| || 14 ||  ||  || 32 || 124 ||  ||  || 2.3 || 8.9 || align=center|
|-
|align="left"| || align="center"|C || align="left"|Michigan State || align="center"|1 || align="center"| || 6 || 21 || 3 || 1 || 11 || 3.5 || 0.5 || 0.2 || 1.8 || align=center|
|-
|align="left" bgcolor="#FFFF99"|^ || align="center"|G/F || align="left"|Illinois || align="center"|4 || align="center"|– || 262 || 9,262 || 812 || 1,636 || 2,344 || 35.4 || 4.0 || 6.2 || 8.9 || align=center|
|-
|align="left"| || align="center"|G || align="left"|Rice || align="center"|1 || align="center"| || 39 || 265 || 35 || 14 || 85 || 6.8 || 0.9 || 0.4 || 2.2 || align=center|
|-
|align="left"| || align="center"|C || align="left"|Kansas || align="center"|1 || align="center"| || 33 || 317 || 74 || 9 || 89 || 9.6 || 2.2 || 0.3 || 2.7 || align=center|
|-
|align="left"| || align="center"|F/C || align="left"|Virginia || align="center"|2 || align="center"|– || 104 || 2,649 || 874 || 51 || 972 || 25.5 || 8.4 || 0.5 || 9.3 || align=center|
|-
|align="left"| || align="center"|F/C || align="left"|Central Michigan || align="center"|2 || align="center"|– || 128 || 1,963 || 481 || 77 || 739 || 15.3 || 3.8 || 0.6 || 5.8 || align=center|
|-
|align="left"| || align="center"|F/C || align="left"|Villanova || align="center"|4 || align="center"|– || 202 || 4,819 || 986 || 97 || 2,173 || 23.9 || 4.9 || 0.5 || 10.8 || align=center|
|-
|align="left"| || align="center"|G || align="left"|Saint Francis (PA) || align="center"|4 || align="center"|– || 190 || 5,995 || 366 || 1,920 || 2,254 || 31.6 || 1.9 || bgcolor="#CFECEC"|10.1 || 11.9 || align=center|
|-
|align="left"| || align="center"|G || align="left"|Louisville || align="center"|1 || align="center"| || 34 || 839 || 101 || 102 || 390 || 24.7 || 3.0 || 3.0 || 11.5 || align=center|
|-
|align="left"| || align="center"|F || align="left"|Kentucky || align="center"|12 || align="center"|– || 792 || 26,166 || 3,683 || 2,074 || 10,006 || 33.0 || 4.7 || 2.6 || 12.6 || align=center|
|-
|align="left"| || align="center"|F/C || align="left"|SMU || align="center"|1 || align="center"| || 4 ||  ||  || 1 || 9 ||  ||  || 0.3 || 2.3 || align=center|
|-
|align="left"| || align="center"|G/F || align="left"|Xavier || align="center"|3 || align="center"|– || 93 || 1,647 || 344 || 78 || 695 || 17.7 || 3.7 || 0.8 || 7.5 || align=center|
|-
|align="left"| || align="center"|F || align="left"|Kansas || align="center"|1 || align="center"| || 35 || 240 || 55 || 10 || 97 || 6.9 || 1.6 || 0.3 || 2.8 || align=center|
|-
|align="left"| || align="center"|F/C || align="left"|Wyoming || align="center"|4 || align="center"|– || 191 || 3,406 || 724 || 48 || 985 || 17.8 || 3.8 || 0.3 || 5.2 || align=center|
|-
|align="left"| || align="center"|C || align="left"|Serbia || align="center"|3 || align="center"|– || 125 || 1,889 || 431 || 51 || 777 || 15.1 || 3.4 || 0.4 || 6.2 || align=center|
|-
|align="left"| || align="center"|F/C || align="left"|Oklahoma City || align="center"|1 || align="center"| || 62 || 753 || 206 || 38 || 208 || 12.1 || 3.3 || 0.6 || 3.4 || align=center|
|-
|align="left"| || align="center"|F || align="left"|Notre Dame || align="center"|2 || align="center"|– || 119 || 2,245 || 762 || 173 || 951 || 18.9 || 6.4 || 1.5 || 8.0 || align=center|
|-
|align="left"| || align="center"|F/C || align="left"|Saint Louis || align="center"|1 || align="center"| || 3 || 9 || 1 || 1 || 2 || 3.0 || 0.3 || 0.3 || 0.7 || align=center|
|-
|align="left"| || align="center"|G || align="left"|Arizona || align="center"|1 || align="center"| || 11 || 112 || 7 || 11 || 25 || 10.2 || 0.6 || 1.0 || 2.3 || align=center|
|-
|align="left"| || align="center"|F || align="left"|Georgetown || align="center"|6 || align="center"|– || 253 || 3,563 || 674 || 85 || 911 || 14.1 || 2.7 || 0.3 || 3.6 || align=center|
|-
|align="left"| || align="center"|G || align="left"|Houston || align="center"|1 || align="center"| || 10 || 44 || 14 || 12 || 21 || 4.4 || 1.4 || 1.2 || 2.1 || align=center|
|-
|align="left"| || align="center"|F || align="left"|Tulane || align="center"|1 || align="center"| || 35 ||  || 61 || 16 || 150 ||  || 1.7 || 0.5 || 4.3 || align=center|
|-
|align="left"| || align="center"|G || align="left"|Arkansas || align="center"|1 || align="center"| || 30 || 941 || 132 || 107 || 279 || 31.4 || 4.4 || 3.6 || 9.3 || align=center|
|-
|align="left"| || align="center"|F/C || align="left"|UConn || align="center"|2 || align="center"|– || 161 || 5,680 || 704 || 470 || 2,158 || 35.3 || 4.4 || 2.9 || 13.4 || align=center|
|-
|align="left"| || align="center"|G/F || align="left"|Michigan || align="center"|1 || align="center"| || 47 || 610 || 71 || 21 || 198 || 13.0 || 1.5 || 0.4 || 4.2 || align=center|
|-
|align="left"| || align="center"|F || align="left"|UNLV || align="center"|1 || align="center"| || 7 || 51 || 5 || 0 || 27 || 7.3 || 0.7 || 0.0 || 3.9 || align=center|
|-
|align="left"| || align="center"|F || align="left"|Virginia Tech || align="center"|1 || align="center"| || 81 || 1,592 || 294 || 112 || 643 || 19.7 || 3.6 || 1.4 || 7.9 || align=center|
|-
|align="left"| || align="center"|F/C || align="left"|Oregon State || align="center"|1 || align="center"| || 72 || 1,154 || 272 || 81 || 381 || 16.0 || 3.8 || 1.1 || 5.3 || align=center|
|-
|align="left" bgcolor="#FFFF99"|^ (#10) || align="center"|F || align="left"|Southeastern Oklahoma State || align="center"|7 || align="center"|– || 549 || 16,345 || 6,299 || 715 || 4,844 || 29.8 || 11.5 || 1.3 || 8.8 || align=center|
|-
|align="left"| || align="center"|F || align="left"|UMass || align="center"|1 || align="center"| || 49 || 372 || 78 || 15 || 90 || 7.6 || 1.6 || 0.3 || 1.8 || align=center|
|-
|align="left"| || align="center"|G/F || align="left"|LIU Brooklyn || align="center"|1 || align="center"| ||  ||  ||  ||  ||  ||  ||  ||  ||  || align=center|
|-
|align="left"| || align="center"|C || align="left"|Clemson || align="center"|1 || align="center"| || 37 || 202 || 42 || 4 || 36 || 5.5 || 1.1 || 0.1 || 1.0 || align=center|
|-
|align="left"| || align="center"|G || align="left"|Washington || align="center"|1 || align="center"| || 5 || 35 || 0 || 10 || 9 || 7.0 || 0.0 || 2.0 || 1.8 || align=center|
|-
|align="left"| || align="center"|G/F || align="left"|Notre Dame || align="center"|2 || align="center"| || 85 || 1,594 || 352 || 170 || 575 || 18.8 || 4.1 || 2.0 || 6.8 || align=center|
|-
|align="left"| || align="center"|F/C || align="left"|Central Michigan || align="center"|1 || align="center"| || 56 || 1,492 || 453 || 102 || 611 || 26.6 || 8.1 || 1.8 || 10.9 || align=center|
|-
|align="left" bgcolor="#FFCC00"|+ || align="center"|F || align="left"|UCLA || align="center"|5 || align="center"|– || 407 || 13,954 || 3,256 || 711 || 5,407 || 34.3 || 8.0 || 1.7 || 13.3 || align=center|
|-
|align="left"| || align="center"|F/C || align="left"|Purdue || align="center"|1 || align="center"| || 6 || 8 || 2 || 0 || 4 || 1.3 || 0.3 || 0.0 || 0.7 || align=center|
|-
|align="left"| || align="center"|F/C || align="left"|Iona || align="center"|1 || align="center"| || 11 || 55 || 18 || 2 || 12 || 5.0 || 1.6 || 0.2 || 1.1 || align=center|
|-
|align="left"| || align="center"|G || align="left"|Western Michigan || align="center"|4 || align="center"|– || 86 || 879 || 92 || 155 || 224 || 10.2 || 1.1 || 1.8 || 2.6 || align=center|
|-
|align="left"| || align="center"|G || align="left"|Jacksonville State || align="center"|1 || align="center"| || 28 || 357 || 26 || 58 || 84 || 12.8 || 0.9 || 2.1 || 3.0 || align=center|
|}

S

|-
|align="left"| || align="center"|F/C || align="left"|Georgia Tech || align="center"|6 || align="center"|– || 459 || 10,261 || 2,095 || 495 || 3,420 || 22.4 || 4.6 || 1.1 || 7.5 || align=center|
|-
|align="left"| || align="center"|C || align="left"|Senegal || align="center"|1 || align="center"| || 4 || 31 || 7 || 0 || 7 || 7.8 || 1.8 || 0.0 || 1.8 || align=center|
|-
|align="left"| || align="center"|G || align="left"|Temple || align="center"|1 || align="center"| || 9 || 37 || 6 || 8 || 0 || 4.1 || 0.7 || 0.9 || 0.0 || align=center|
|-
|align="left" bgcolor="#FFCC00"|+ || align="center"|F || align="left"|West Virginia || align="center"|5 || align="center"|– || 290 || 5,394 || 1,392 || 873 || 3,683 || 35.0 || 6.3 || 3.0 || 12.7 || align=center|
|-
|align="left"| || align="center"|F/C || align="left"|Hamline || align="center"|1 || align="center"| || 32 ||  ||  || 81 || 271 ||  ||  || 2.5 || 8.5 || align=center|
|-
|align="left"| || align="center"|G || align="left"|Richmond || align="center"|1 || align="center"| || 3 || 7 || 1 || 0 || 0 || 2.3 || 0.3 || 0.0 || 0.0 || align=center|
|-
|align="left"| || align="center"|G || align="left"|San Francisco || align="center"|2 || align="center"|– || 80 || 2,094 || 186 || 168 || 640 || 26.2 || 2.3 || 2.1 || 8.0 || align=center|
|-
|align="left"| || align="center"|F/C || align="left"|Portland || align="center"|6 || align="center"|– || 421 || 13,885 || 4,508 || 1,128 || 6,724 || 33.0 || 10.7 || 2.7 || 16.0 || align=center|
|-
|align="left"| || align="center"|G || align="left"|St. John's || align="center"|1 || align="center"| || 77 || 1,641 || 219 || 100 || 591 || 21.3 || 2.8 || 1.3 || 7.7 || align=center|
|-
|align="left"| || align="center"|F/C || align="left"|Ohio State || align="center"|1 || align="center"| || 43 || 226 || 42 || 14 || 102 || 5.3 || 1.0 || 0.3 || 2.4 || align=center|
|-
|align="left"| || align="center"|G/F || align="left"|Rutgers || align="center"|1 || align="center"| || 44 || 329 || 41 || 25 || 198 || 7.5 || 0.9 || 0.6 || 4.5 || align=center|
|-
|align="left"| || align="center"|C || align="left"|Bowling Green || align="center"|3 || align="center"|– || 151 || 2,081 || 766 || 150 || 638 || 13.8 || 5.1 || 1.0 || 4.2 || align=center|
|-
|align="left"| || align="center"|F || align="left"|UAB || align="center"|1 || align="center"| || 8 || 20 || 3 || 0 || 8 || 2.5 || 0.4 || 0.0 || 1.0 || align=center|
|-
|align="left"| || align="center"|F || align="left"|Maryland || align="center"|1 || align="center"| || 20 || 76 || 19 || 4 || 32 || 3.8 || 1.0 || 0.2 || 1.6 || align=center|
|-
|align="left" bgcolor="#FFCC00"|+ || align="center"|G || align="left"|Maryland || align="center"|6 || align="center"|– || 440 || 17,390 || 2,204 || 1,931 || 8,034 || bgcolor="#CFECEC"|39.5 || 5.0 || 4.4 || 18.3 || align=center|
|-
|align="left"| || align="center"|F/C || align="left"|Notre Dame || align="center"|2 || align="center"| || 71 || 2,398 || 624 || 131 || 1,045 || 33.8 || 8.8 || 1.8 || 14.7 || align=center|
|-
|align="left"| || align="center"|G/F || align="left"|Michigan State || align="center"|2 || align="center"|– || 109 || 2,336 || 263 || 267 || 1,190 || 21.4 || 2.4 || 2.4 || 10.9 || align=center|
|-
|align="left"| || align="center"|F || align="left"|Duke || align="center"|3 || align="center"|– || 218 || 5,917 || 772 || 219 || 1,889 || 27.1 || 3.5 || 1.0 || 8.7 || align=center|
|-
|align="left"| || align="center"|G || align="left"|Niagara || align="center"|2 || align="center"| || 12 || 48 || 2 || 3 || 13 || 4.0 || 0.2 || 0.3 || 1.1 || align=center|
|-
|align="left"| || align="center"|G || align="left"|Louisville || align="center"|1 || align="center"| || 24 || 224 || 14 || 34 || 54 || 9.3 || 0.6 || 1.4 || 2.3 || align=center|
|-
|align="left"| || align="center"|G || align="left"|UMass || align="center"|1 || align="center"| || 69 || 1,274 || 172 || 113 || 485 || 18.5 || 2.5 || 1.6 || 7.0 || align=center|
|-
|align="left"| || align="center"|G/F || align="left"|Illinois || align="center"|1 || align="center"| || 59 ||  ||  || 138 || 394 ||  ||  || 2.3 || 6.7 || align=center|
|-
|align="left"| || align="center"|G || align="left"|Wake Forest || align="center"|3 || align="center"|– || 219 || 5,249 || 604 || 981 || 2,153 || 24.0 || 2.8 || 4.5 || 9.8 || align=center|
|-
|align="left"| || align="center"|F || align="left"|Ohio State || align="center"|1 || align="center"| || 4 || 18 || 5 || 0 || 8 || 4.5 || 1.3 || 0.0 || 2.0 || align=center|
|-
|align="left"| || align="center"|F || align="left"|Maryland || align="center"|1 || align="center"| || 69 || 1,941 || 491 || 79 || 847 || 28.1 || 7.1 || 1.1 || 12.3 || align=center|
|-
|align="left"| || align="center"|F || align="left"|Oak Hill Academy (VA) || align="center"|2 || align="center"|– || 105 || 3,626 || 722 || 384 || 1,631 || 34.5 || 6.9 || 3.7 || 15.5 || align=center|
|-
|align="left"| || align="center"|G || align="left"|North Carolina || align="center"|1 || align="center"| || 9 || 64 || 5 || 10 || 23 || 7.1 || 0.6 || 1.1 || 2.6 || align=center|
|-
|align="left"| || align="center"|G || align="left"|Western Kentucky || align="center"|2 || align="center"|– || 72 || 1,378 || 231 || 121 || 491 || 19.1 || 3.2 || 1.7 || 6.8 || align=center|
|-
|align="left" bgcolor="#FFCC00"|+ || align="center"|G/F || align="left"|North Carolina || align="center"|5 || align="center"|– || 337 || 12,033 || 1,242 || 1,470 || 7,451 || 35.7 || 3.7 || 4.4 || 22.1 || align=center|
|-
|align="left"| || align="center"|F || align="left"|Thomas More || align="center"|1 || align="center"| || 20 || 255 || 69 || 12 || 114 || 12.8 || 3.5 || 0.6 || 5.7 || align=center|
|-
|align="left"| || align="center"|G/F || align="left"|Georgia Tech || align="center"|1 || align="center"| || 54 || 486 || 57 || 36 || 253 || 9.0 || 1.1 || 0.7 || 4.7 || align=center|
|-
|align="left"| || align="center"|C || align="left"|Bradley || align="center"|3 || align="center"|– || 231 || 6,365 || 2,296 || 245 || 1,977 || 27.6 || 9.9 || 1.1 || 8.6 || align=center|
|-
|align="left"| || align="center"|G || align="left"|Eastern Washington || align="center"|7 || align="center"|– || 483 || 14,045 || 1,424 || 1,888 || 6,491 || 29.1 || 2.9 || 3.9 || 13.4 || align=center|
|-
|align="left"| || align="center"|F || align="left"|Georgetown || align="center"|2 || align="center"|– || 66 || 604 || 57 || 18 || 208 || 9.2 || 0.9 || 0.3 || 3.2 || align=center|
|-
|align="left"| || align="center"|G || align="left"|Florida State || align="center"|1 || align="center"| || 53 || 707 || 103 || 89 || 199 || 13.3 || 1.9 || 1.7 || 3.8 || align=center|
|}

T

|-
|align="left"| || align="center"|G/F || align="left"|Marquette || align="center"|1 || align="center"| || 76 || 1,195 || 121 || 72 || 592 || 15.7 || 1.6 || 0.9 || 7.8 || align=center|
|-
|align="left"| || align="center"|G || align="left"|Texas Tech || align="center"|1 || align="center"| || 12 || 44 || 4 || 3 || 21 || 3.7 || 0.3 || 0.3 || 1.8 || align=center|
|-
|align="left"| || align="center"|G/F || align="left"|Baylor || align="center"|1 || align="center"| || 2 || 5 || 0 || 0 || 2 || 2.5 || 0.0 || 0.0 || 1.0 || align=center|
|-
|align="left"| || align="center"|F/C || align="left"|Hofstra || align="center"|2 || align="center"|– || 85 || 876 || 272 || 24 || 337 || 10.3 || 3.2 || 0.3 || 4.0 || align=center|
|-
|align="left"| || align="center"|G || align="left"|Weber State || align="center"|1 || align="center"| || 18 || 99 || 9 || 8 || 46 || 5.5 || 0.5 || 0.4 || 2.6 || align=center|
|-
|align="left"| || align="center"|G/F || align="left"|Bradley || align="center"|2 || align="center"|– || 56 || 406 || 39 || 28 || 106 || 7.3 || 0.7 || 0.5 || 1.9 || align=center|
|-
|align="left"| || align="center"|G || align="left"|Eastern Michigan || align="center"|1 || align="center"| || 36 || 156 || 22 || 22 || 48 || 4.3 || 0.6 || 0.6 || 1.3 || align=center|
|-
|align="left" bgcolor="#FFFF99"|^ || align="center"|G || align="left"|Indiana || align="center"|13 || align="center"|– || 979 || bgcolor="#CFECEC"|35,516 || 3,478 || bgcolor="#CFECEC"|9,061 || bgcolor="#CFECEC"|18,822 || 36.3 || 3.6 || 9.3 || 19.2 || align=center|
|-
|align="left" bgcolor="#CCFFCC"|x || align="center"|G || align="left"|Creighton || align="center"|1 || align="center"| || 26 || 195 || 20 || 8 || 61 || 7.5 || 0.8 || 0.3 || 2.3 || align=center|
|-
|align="left"| || align="center"|F || align="left"|Detroit Mercy || align="center"|1 || align="center"| || 28 || 136 || 36 || 3 || 77 || 4.9 || 1.3 || 0.1 || 2.8 || align=center|
|-
|align="left" bgcolor="#FFFF99"|^ || align="center"|G || align="left"|West Virginia || align="center"|2 || align="center"|– || 101 || 2,585 || 367 || 225 || 1,192 || 25.6 || 3.6 || 2.2 || 11.8 || align=center|
|-
|align="left"| || align="center"|F/C || align="left"|Providence || align="center"|2 || align="center"|– || 161 || 5,502 || 1,310 || 291 || 2,197 || 34.2 || 8.1 || 1.8 || 13.6 || align=center|
|-
|align="left"| || align="center"|F || align="left"|Indiana || align="center"|2 || align="center"|– || 77 || 870 || 189 || 45 || 293 || 11.3 || 2.5 || 0.6 || 3.8 || align=center|
|-
|align="left"| || align="center"|F/C || align="left"|Creighton || align="center"|3 || align="center"|– || 203 || 4,258 || 662 || 191 || 1,488 || 21.0 || 3.3 || 0.9 || 7.3 || align=center|
|-
|align="left"| || align="center"|G/F || align="left"|St. John's || align="center"|1 || align="center"| || 53 ||  ||  || 99 || 466 ||  ||  || 1.9 || 8.8 || align=center|
|-
|align="left"| || align="center"|F/C || align="left"|Western Kentucky || align="center"|1 || align="center"| || 22 ||  ||  || 35 || 164 ||  ||  || 1.6 || 7.5 || align=center|
|-
|align="left"| || align="center"|F/C || align="left"|Long Beach State || align="center"|4 || align="center"|– || 242 || 4,120 || 828 || 197 || 2,092 || 17.0 || 3.4 || 0.8 || 8.6 || align=center|
|-
|align="left"| || align="center"|F/C || align="left"|Seattle || align="center"|3 || align="center"|– || 169 || 3,980 || 1,302 || 264 || 1,792 || 23.6 || 7.7 || 1.6 || 10.6 || align=center|
|-
|align="left"| || align="center"|G/F || align="left"|DePaul || align="center"|1 || align="center"| || 55 ||  ||  || 96 || 334 ||  ||  || 1.7 || 6.1 || align=center|
|-
|align="left" bgcolor="#FFCC00"|+ || align="center"|G/F || align="left"|Notre Dame || align="center"|5 || align="center"|– || 352 || 12,123 || 1,579 || 1,135 || 7,597 || 34.4 || 4.5 || 3.2 || 21.6 || align=center|
|-
|align="left"| || align="center"|G/F || align="left"|Detroit Mercy || align="center"|7 || align="center"|– || 574 || 15,917 || 3,583 || 776 || 6,638 || 27.7 || 6.2 || 1.4 || 11.6 || align=center|
|}

U to Z

|-
|align="left"| || align="center"|G || align="left"|Slovenia || align="center"|1 || align="center"| || 39 || 560 || 57 || 131 || 227 || 14.4 || 1.5 || 3.4 || 5.8 || align=center|
|-
|align="left"| || align="center"|G/F || align="left"|Indiana || align="center"|3 || align="center"|– || 208 || 5,007 || 782 || 477 || 2,128 || 24.1 || 3.8 || 2.3 || 10.2 || align=center|
|-
|align="left"| || align="center"|C || align="left"|Bosnia and Herzegovina || align="center"|1 || align="center"| || 1 || 6 || 1 || 0 || 5 || 6.0 || 1.0 || 0.0 || 5.0 || align=center|
|-
|align="left"| || align="center"|G || align="left"|Southern Illinois || align="center"|2 || align="center"|– || 88 || 1,454 || 130 || 179 || 500 || 16.5 || 1.5 || 2.0 || 5.7 || align=center|
|-
|align="left"| || align="center"|F || align="left"|Michigan || align="center"|2 || align="center"|– || 80 || 773 || 237 || 22 || 202 || 9.7 || 3.0 || 0.3 || 2.5 || align=center|
|-
|align="left"| || align="center"|F || align="left"|UConn || align="center"|5 || align="center"|– || 256 || 4,966 || 983 || 167 || 2,421 || 19.4 || 3.8 || 0.7 || 9.5 || align=center|
|-
|align="left"| || align="center"|F/C || align="left"|Saint Mary's Minnesota || align="center"|1 || align="center"| || 63 ||  ||  || 90 || 143 ||  ||  || 1.4 || 2.3 || align=center|
|-
|align="left"| || align="center"|G || align="left"|Loyola (IL) || align="center"|1 || align="center"| || 71 || 578 || 76 || 69 || 172 || 8.1 || 1.1 || 1.0 || 2.4 || align=center|
|-
|align="left"| || align="center"|G || align="left"|Arkansas || align="center"|2 || align="center"|– || 83 || 1,685 || 257 || 214 || 395 || 20.3 || 3.1 || 2.6 || 4.8 || align=center|
|-
|align="left" bgcolor="#FFCC00"|+ || align="center"|G || align="left"|Providence || align="center"|5 || align="center"|– || 388 || 11,941 || 972 || 1,278 || 6,262 || 30.8 || 2.5 || 3.3 || 16.1 || align=center|
|-
|align="left" bgcolor="#FFCC00"|+ (#3) || align="center"|F/C || align="left"|Virginia Union || align="center"|9 || align="center"|–– || 655 || 21,358 || 7,264 || 997 || 4,337 || 32.6 || 11.1 || 1.5 || 6.6 || align=center|
|-
|align="left"| || align="center"|F || align="left"|Syracuse || align="center"|1 || align="center"| || 40 || 527 || 83 || 23 || 237 || 13.2 || 2.1 || 0.6 || 5.9 || align=center|
|-
|align="left" bgcolor="#FFCC00"|+ || align="center"|F/C || align="left"|North Carolina || align="center"|6 || align="center"|– || 399 || 13,028 || 2,890 || 719 || 5,356 || 32.7 || 7.2 || 1.8 || 13.4 || align=center|
|-
|align="left"| || align="center"|G/F || align="left"|Tennessee || align="center"|1 || align="center"| || 68 || 820 || 155 || 131 || 166 || 12.1 || 2.3 || 1.9 || 2.4 || align=center|
|-
|align="left"| || align="center"|G/F || align="left"|Pepperdine || align="center"|1 || align="center"| || 10 || 78 || 16 || 10 || 24 || 7.8 || 1.6 || 1.0 || 2.4 || align=center|
|-
|align="left"| || align="center"|F/C || align="left"|Michigan || align="center"|1 || align="center"| || 43 || 1,277 || 288 || 127 || 486 || 29.7 || 6.7 || 3.0 || 11.3 || align=center|
|-
|align="left"| || align="center"|F/C || align="left"|Old Dominion || align="center"|2 || align="center"|– || 114 || 2,225 || 541 || 24 || 650 || 19.5 || 4.7 || 0.2 || 5.7 || align=center|
|-
|align="left"| || align="center"|F || align="left"|Charlotte || align="center"|1 || align="center"| || 16 || 129 || 18 || 12 || 56 || 8.1 || 1.1 || 0.8 || 3.5 || align=center|
|-
|align="left"| || align="center"|F || align="left"|Maryland || align="center"|2 || align="center"|– || 91 || 1,436 || 388 || 56 || 576 || 15.8 || 4.3 || 0.6 || 6.3 || align=center|
|-
|align="left"| || align="center"|F || align="left"|UCLA || align="center"|1 || align="center"| || 9 || 129 || 19 || 10 || 34 || 14.3 || 2.1 || 1.1 || 3.8 || align=center|
|-
|align="left"| || align="center"|G/F || align="left"|Georgia || align="center"|1 || align="center"| || 60 || 922 || 100 || 44 || 193 || 15.4 || 1.7 || 0.7 || 3.2 || align=center|
|-
|align="left"| || align="center"|F || align="left"|Idaho State || align="center"|1 || align="center"| || 2 || 7 || 1 || 0 || 0 || 3.5 || 0.5 || 0.0 || 0.0 || align=center|
|-
|align="left"| || align="center"|G || align="left"|Bowling Green || align="center"|1 || align="center"| || 3 || 18 || 3 || 2 || 4 || 6.0 || 1.0 || 0.7 || 1.3 || align=center|
|-
|align="left"| || align="center"|F/C || align="left"|Winston-Salem State || align="center"|1 || align="center"| || 46 || 562 || 251 || 18 || 168 || 12.2 || 5.5 || 0.4 || 3.7 || align=center|
|-
|align="left"| || align="center"|F || align="left"|Georgetown || align="center"|5 || align="center"|– || 275 || 5,542 || 1,845 || 178 || 1,744 || 20.2 || 6.7 || 0.6 || 6.3 || align=center|
|-
|align="left"| || align="center"|G || align="left"|Baylor || align="center"|1 || align="center"| || 49 || 358 || 27 || 70 || 127 || 7.3 || 0.6 || 1.4 || 2.6 || align=center|
|-
|align="left"| || align="center"|F || align="left"|Memphis || align="center"|1 || align="center"| || 19 || 163 || 27 || 8 || 49 || 8.6 || 1.4 || 0.4 || 2.6 || align=center|
|-
|align="left"| || align="center"|F || align="left"|Indiana || align="center"|1 || align="center"| || 53 ||  ||  || 82 || 215 ||  ||  || 1.5 || 4.1 || align=center|
|-
|align="left"| || align="center"|F || align="left"|Arkansas || align="center"|4 || align="center"|– || 266 || 6,136 || 1,101 || 283 || 3,213 || 23.1 || 4.1 || 1.1 || 12.1 || align=center|
|-
|align="left"| || align="center"|G || align="left"|Baltimore || align="center"|1 || align="center"| || 48 || 322 || 47 || 41 || 167 || 6.7 || 1.0 || 0.9 || 3.5 || align=center|
|-
|align="left"| || align="center"|G || align="left"|Wyoming || align="center"|1 || align="center"| || 9 || 193 || 47 || 32 || 36 || 21.4 || 5.2 || 3.6 || 4.0 || align=center|
|-
|align="left"| || align="center"|F || align="left"|Nevada || align="center"|1 || align="center"| || 78 || 1,182 || 239 || 51 || 322 || 15.2 || 3.1 || 0.7 || 4.1 || align=center|
|-
|align="left"| || align="center"|F || align="left"|Notre Dame || align="center"|2 || align="center"|– || 132 || 3,590 || 436 || 200 || 1,801 || 27.2 || 3.3 || 1.5 || 13.6 || align=center|
|-
|align="left"| || align="center"|F/C || align="left"|Seattle || align="center"|1 || align="center"| || 2 || 6 || 0 || 0 || 0 || 3.0 || 0.0 || 0.0 || 0.0 || align=center|
|-
|align="left"| || align="center"|G || align="left"|Grambling State || align="center"|2 || align="center"|– || 46 || 1,003 || 88 || 153 || 335 || 21.8 || 1.9 || 3.3 || 7.3 || align=center|
|-
|align="left" bgcolor="#FFFF99"|^ || align="center"|G/F || align="left"|Stanford || align="center"|6 || align="center"|– || 384 || 12,945 || 3,537 || 668 || 7,339 || 33.7 || 9.2 || 1.7 || 19.1 || align=center|
|-
|align="left"| || align="center"|G || align="left"|Wake Forest || align="center"|1 || align="center"| || 65 || 836 || 47 || 119 || 188 || 12.9 || 0.7 || 1.8 || 2.9 || align=center|
|-
|align="left"| || align="center"|F || align="left"|Hargrave Military Academy (VA) || align="center"|1 || align="center"| || 3 || 15 || 4 || 1 || 13 || 5.0 || 1.3 || 0.3 || 4.3 || align=center|
|-
|align="left"| || align="center"|G/F || align="left"|St. John's || align="center"|3 || align="center"|– || 124 || 3,208 || 296 || 317 || 1,368 || 25.9 || 2.4 || 2.6 || 11.0 || align=center|
|-
|align="left"| || align="center"|C || align="left"|Kent State || align="center"|1 || align="center"| || 7 || 30 || 8 || 1 || 2 || 4.3 || 1.1 || 0.1 || 0.3 || align=center|
|}

References

External links
 Basketball-reference.com player register
 2007–08 Detroit Pistons media guide
 Detroit Pistons all-time roster 1941-2018 NBA Hoops Online

National Basketball Association all-time rosters

roster